= Andrii Pilshchykov =

Ukrainian fighter pilot (1993–2023)

- Андрій Пільщиков
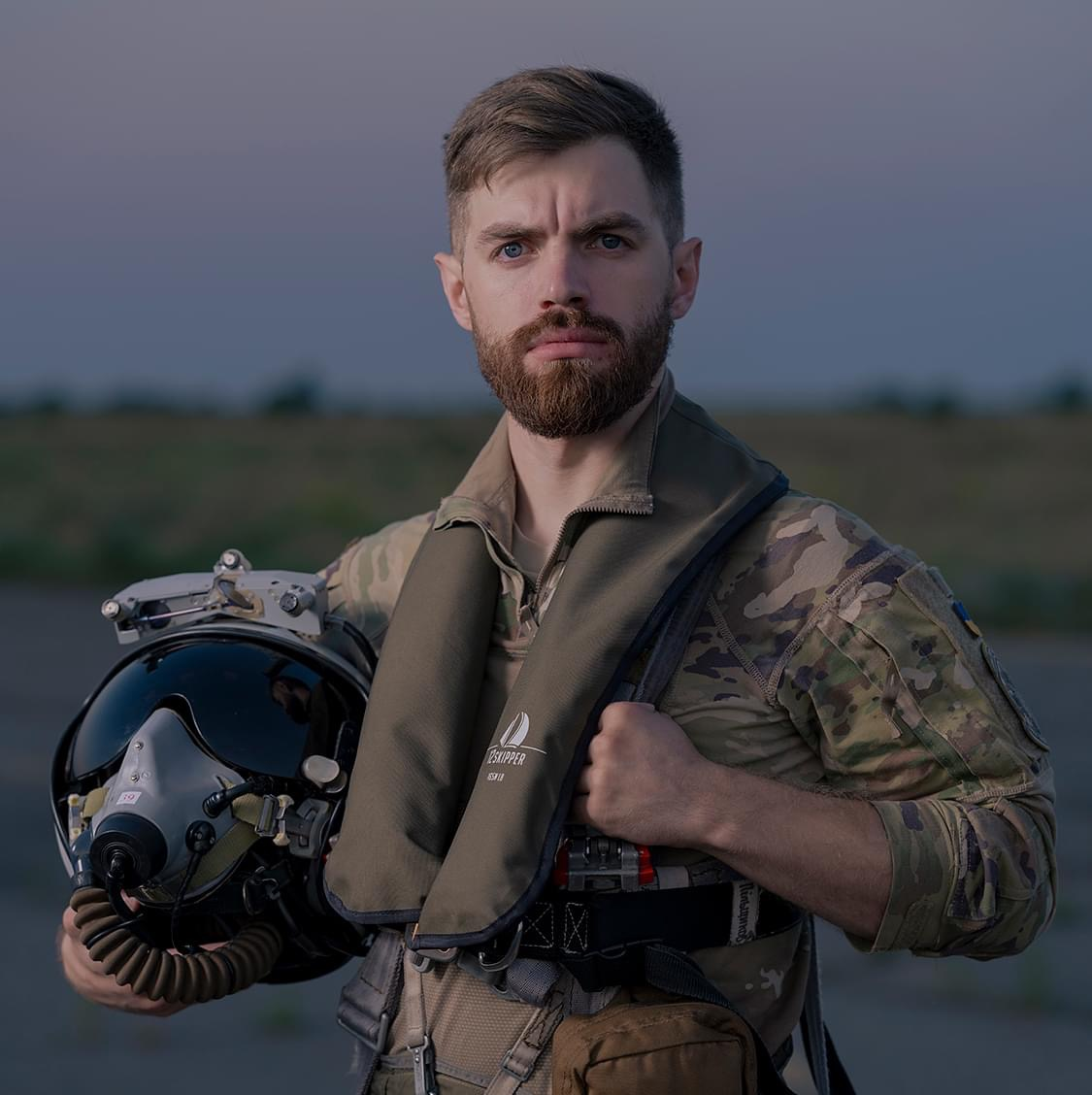
- Pilshchykov in 2023
- Born: Andrii Borysovych Pilshchykov; 3 February 1993; Kharkiv, Ukraine
- Died: 25 August 2023 (aged 30) near Sinhury, Zhytomyr Oblast, Ukraine
- Burial place: Askold's Grave, Kyiv, Ukraine
- Education: Ivan Kozhedub National Air Force University
- Spouse: Melaniya Podolyak
- Military career
- Allegiance: Ukraine
- Branch: Ukrainian Air Force
- Service years: 2015–2021, 2022–2023
- Rank: Major (posthumously)
- Nickname: Juice (Джус)
- Unit: 40th Tactical Aviation Brigade
- Known for: Advocacy of providing Ukraine with F-16s
- Conflicts: Russo-Ukrainian War
- Awards: Order of the Gold Star Order for Courage, 2nd class Order for Courage, 3rd class

Andrii Borysovych Pilshchykov (Ukrainian: Андрій Борисович Пільщиков; 3 February 1993 – 25 August 2023) was a Ukrainian fighter pilot with the call sign "Juice" (Джус) and a captain in the 40th Tactical Aviation Brigade of the Ukrainian Air Force. He was qualified as a 2nd Class pilot and flew Mikoyan MiG-29s during the Russian invasion of Ukraine. Pilshchykov was awarded the Order for Courage, 3rd class, in May 2022, and posthumously promoted to the rank of major. In 2024, he was posthumously awarded the title of Hero of Ukraine.

== Life and career ==
=== Early life ===
Born in Kharkiv, Pilshchykov spent his school years at the Gymnasium No. 116. As a teenager, Pilshchykov was interested in aviation and often visited local airfields.

On 24 May 2008, Pilshchykov uploaded his first aircraft spotting photo to Ukrainian Spotter's Site with a comment: “Sorry for quality - there was nothing but a mobile phone at hand:(”. Until 26 September 2020, he contributed 705 photos from all around Ukraine and other countries he visited and accelerated aircraft spotting movement in Kharkivshyna. Since 2011, Andrii has been listed on Ukrainian Spotter's Site as a content editor and one of the forum admins.

Pilshchykov took to the sky for the first time on Lilienthal X-32-912 Bekas ultralight aircraft with a pilot of Ukrainian community organization the "Civil Air Patrol" (Kharkiv).

=== Pilot training ===
In 2011, Pilshchykov enrolled in Ivan Kozhedub National University of the Air Force, graduating in 2018. While a cadet, Pilshchykov taught classes and organized field trips for the "Civil Air Patrol".

On 16–29 July 2011, Pilshchykov took part in a multinational exercise the "Safe Skies 2011" at Myrhorod Air Base, where he for the first time saw F-16s.

On 19 April 2016, Pilshchykov made his first solo flight in a MiG-29 fighter jet after a five-year training program. On 8–19 October 2018, Pilshchykov took part in the international exercise "Clear Sky 2018" at the Starokostiantyniv Air Base.

=== Military service ===
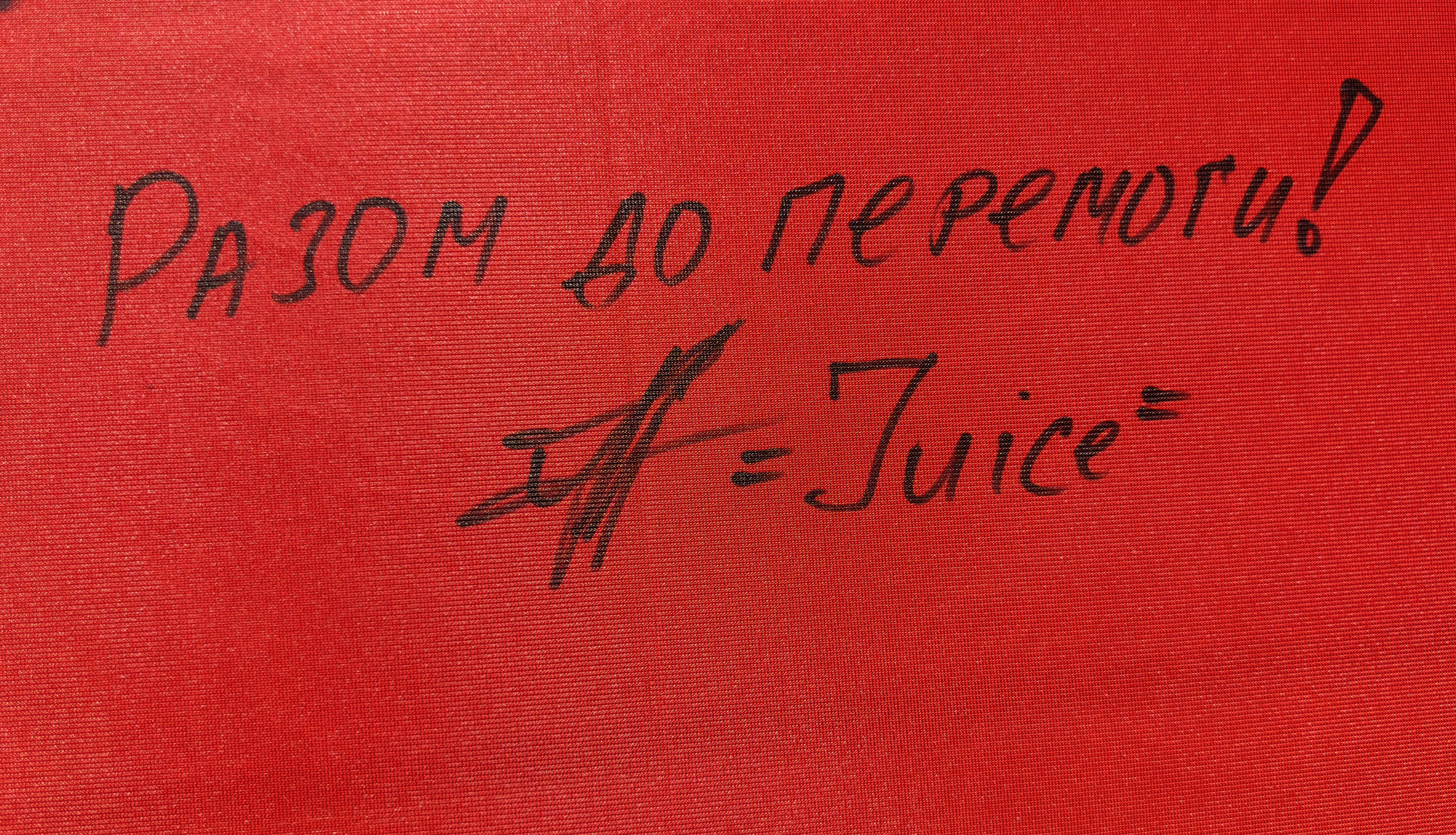
"Together to victory!", signed "Juice", April 7, 2023

In winter 2018, Pilshchykov graduated and was assigned to the 40th Tactical Aviation Brigade at Vasylkiv Air Base.

In September 2019, Pilshchykov traveled to California, where he completed an internship at the 144th Fighter Wing of the California Air National Guard, where he flew an F-15. At that time, his American friends gave him the call sign "Juice" because he would not drink alcoholic beverages during joint training exercises, preferring juice instead.

“During a break between flights, we went to a pizzeria in our flight suits, made an order, and when it was delivered, the waiter said: “The bill has already been taken care of.” Andrii asked: “How, by whom?” And he saw a man, a veteran, at the next table. He [veteran] said: “God bless America! Thank you for defending our country in the air.” This attitude was quite unusual. It was even more unusual when the patrol police stopped by the cafe and the American pilots paid for the police officers’ order, saying: “Thank you for protecting our families while we protect America.” Andrii saw how pilots, military pilots, are treated in America, and he tried to do everything he could to make sure that pilots in Ukraine were treated the same way.”

— Volodymyr B., Born for the sky: Andrii “Juice” Pilshchykov obituary, Studying at the Ivan Kozhedub National Air Force University and serving in the Air Force of Ukraine

For some time, Pilshchykov was the only pilot of the Armed Forces of Ukraine with an official call sign.

In 2021, Pilshchykov left the Air Force. In a resignation letter he added a long detailed list of Air Force's organizational issues as the reasons for his decision. At the time the Ukrainian Air Force had no interest to do anything to keep pilots interested in continuous service.

=== Reenlisting and flying again ===
In February 2022, from the beginning of the large-scale Russian invasion, Pilshchykov decided not to wait for mobilization and returned to the Air Force. Initially he took part in securing airfields, but later resumed flights to defend Ukraine's skies. He participated in the air defense of Kyiv and other territories. Beginning in March 2022, “Juice” gave several live interviews to CNN in between sorties, without disclosing his name and wearing either a helmet or a bandana over his mouth.

By 7 May 2022, Pilshchykov had 500 hours of combat flight time. By his death, Andrii participated in more than 100 combat flights and destroyed dozens of Russian command posts.

On 2 June 2023, he and fellow pilot Vladyslav Savieliev (call sign "Nomad") completed a successful combat mission in the east, launching HARM missiles from their MiG-29s.

=== Death ===
Andrii Pilshchykov died on the evening of 25 August 2023, along with two other pilots, Major Viacheslav Minka and Major Serhii Prokazin, when their two L-39M1 trainer planes collided in the air performing a whifferdill turn maneuver during dogfight training near Sinhury, Zhytomyr Oblast. His death was reported by CNN, and widely covered in Ukrainian media, which published full archive photographs where his face can be seen. On 26 August 2023, President Volodymyr Zelenskyy of Ukraine mentioned Pilshchykov's death in an address.

== Advocacy efforts ==
During his service in the Air Force, Pilshchykov advocated for the need to promote the Air Force's work in the media with high-quality photos and videos. According to Yurii Ihnat, the spokesman for the Air Force, Pilshchikov actively took part in modernizing the Air Force's public affairs work and was involved in official communication with foreign media thanks to his good English and deep knowledge of aviation.

Pilshchykov was mentioned as an authoritative reference on challenges faced by the Ukrainian Air Force and the need to supply F-16 fighters to Ukraine. In interviews with The Washington Post, the Financial Times, CNN, Fox News, and the BBC News, he called on Western partners to provide Ukraine with modern fighter jets.

In June 2022, Pilshchykov visited the US with another Ukrainian pilot, call sign Moonfish, to lobby for F-16s for Ukraine. Sean Penn joined Pilshchykov and Moonfish to help their advocacy efforts. The pilots met with US lawmakers to discuss modern weapons systems needed in Ukraine. Juice and Moonfish met with Adam Kinzinger in his office in Washington, D.C. As a result of that meeting, Adam Kinzinger introduced the "Ukraine Fighter Pilots Act" to the United States House of Representatives on 17 June 2022. The bill was cosponsored by Chrissy Houlahan, Ted Lieu, Susan Wild, Tom Malinowski, Abigail Spanberger and Mike Levin.

Pilshchykov was involved in the coordination of aid supply of equipment for Ukrainian pilots of the Air Force, the Army Aviation and the State Emergency Service of Ukraine, and he donated his own money to provide helicopters pilots with modern helmets. He was collaborated with the team of the "Wingmen for Ukraine", an American 501(c)(3) organization created under the name the "Stop the War in Europe" by Anastasiia Armey and her husband, Maj. Drew Armey, a reservist pilot of the 144th Fighter Wing, together with author Adam Makos and Lt. Col. Jonathan "Jersey" Burd, a retired pilot of the 194th Fighter Squadron, who helped to train and strengthen Ukrainian Air Force since 2013.

Adam Makos was the originator of an idea to organize an official visit of Andrii Pilshchykov and other Ukrainian pilots to the United States, and also helped Pilshchykov to reach out and meet journalists of many Western media and press. Pilshchykov also is an author of and idea to launch a custom Lego minifigure the "Ghost of Kyiv - Ukrainian Pilot" in a collaboration with a toys company the Brickmania LLC, were all the benefits from the sales of this minifig are sent to the "Wingmen for Ukraine".

In early 2022, the Brickmania company launched the "Ukraine Benefit", a series of custom Lego sets and minifigs, were all "proceeds from these projects will go to benefit United24, Wingmen for Ukraine, Direct Relief, Ukrainian Red Cross, and other organizations directly involved in providing relief to the Ukrainian people".

A special thanks to bestselling author Adam Makos (A Higher Call, Devotion) for the help in making this endeavor possible and Ukrainian MiG-29 pilot call sign “Juice” who assisted this project from the front lines.

— Brickmania, Ghost of Kyiv - Ukrainian Pilot

== Ghost of Kyiv ==
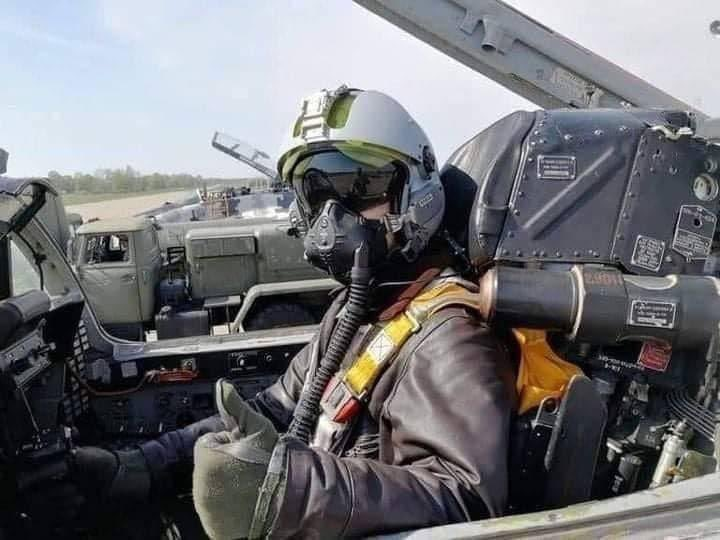
An image shared by Petro Poroshenko on Twitter, as a photo of the "Ghost of Kyiv".

On 25 February 2022, former Ukrainian president Petro Poroshenko tweeted an image, claiming it as a photo of Ghost of Kyiv. The photo was later found to be a down-scaled version of an image from a set of three photos posted on Twitter and in a news article on site by the Ministry of Defence on 25 April 2019 showing a pilot wearing flight helmet with a tinted visor. In a post on Facebook from the Air Force Command, dated 25 April 2019, there were four photos instead of three, where one extra photo showed the forehead and eyes of pilot's face.

On 2 March 2022, Military.com stated that the "Ghost of Kyiv" was "almost certainly a myth, albeit an incredibly useful one as Ukraine tries to rally its citizens to resist Russian conquest".

On 29 April 2022, after Ukrainian fighter pilot Stepan Tarabalka died in action, The Times claimed that Tarabalka was the "Ghost of Kyiv".

On 30 April 2022, Ukraine's Air Force Command admitted the mythical status of the "Ghost of Kyiv," writing that the "Ghost of Kyiv is a superhero-legend, whose character was created by Ukrainians," and that the "#GhostOfKyiv is alive, it embodies the collective spirit of the highly qualified pilots".

On 27 August 2022, on the Aviation Day (Ukraine state holiday) Charity Foundation "For My Ukraine" and Ukrainian artist Andrii Kovtun presented mural the "Ghost of Kyiv", which is based on viral photo "Ghost of Kyiv". On 19 May 2023, Pilshchykov tweeted a selfie of himself standing in a front of this mural adding "Waiting for The Ghost Vipers🇺🇦👍".

After Pilshchykov died, "Stalker", Andrii's mentor from the "Civil Air Patrol", revealed the origin of the "Ghost of Kyiv" myth:

“Stalker” said that the “Ghosts of Kyiv” was Andrii’s idea.

“The commanders approved this idea as trolling the Russians, who said they had destroyed all the aviation on the first day of the war. And Andrii, who had such a caustic trolling style, said: “And here we are on the very planes that they destroyed, which are not there – we are fighting them so much. And who are we? Ghosts!” says “Stalker”.

— Volodymyr B., Born for the sky: Andrii “Juice” Pilshchykov obituary, Full scale war

It was also revealed that it was Pilshchykov in the photo initially posted by Poroshenko as a photo of "Ghost of Kyiv":

== Legacy ==
=== Farewell ceremonies ===
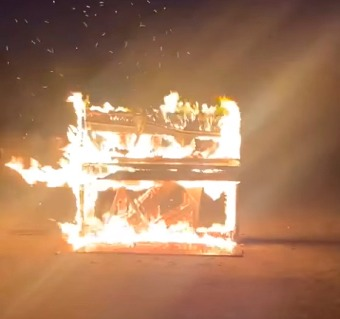
The piano burning ceremony for Ukrainian pilots Viacheslav Minka, Serhii Prokazin and Andrii Pilshchykov ("Juice").

On 26 August 2023, the Ukrainian Air Force held a piano burning ceremony for Pilshchykov, Minka and Prokazin. The pilots' call signs and the tail numbers of both L-39M1s, "102" (for "102 BLUE") and "107" (for "107 BLUE"), were painted on the piano. Air Force and Ministry of Defense of Ukraine tweeted a video of the piano burning.

On 29 August 2023, on the Day of Remembrance of the Defenders of Ukraine, after nonpublic farewell ceremony for all three died pilots has been held at the Vasylkiv Air Base the public memorial service for Andrii Pilshchykov has been held in the Cathedral of the Resurrection of Christ in Kyiv. Then Andrii was buried at the Askold's Grave, where also was buried Hero of Ukraine Dmytro Kotsiubailo just few months earlier.

During the burial ceremony, Liliya Averyanova, the mother of Pilshchykov, asked Mykola Oleshchuk, the Commander of the Ukrainian Air Force, to promise her that she would "take a circle" in the sky, instead of her son, onboard of the first F-16 that would be delivered to Ukraine, and Oleshchuk answered in the affirmative: “Definitely”. Maria Avdeeva, a Research Director at the European Expert Association in Ukraine, tweeted a video fragment of this conversation. On 25 August 2024, on the anniversary of the death of "Juice", the commander of the Armed Forces of Ukraine Mykola Oleshchuk allowed the pilot's mother to stay in the cockpit of the F-16.

=== Film ===
A team of the Militarnyi, a Ukrainian military news site to which Pilshchykov contributed for years, and who were Andrii's close friends, created a 39-minute-long film the «Callsign Juice Andrii Pilshchykov. Militarnyi. Memoirs». Their Web site also published an obituary that recounted Andrii's life story, largely overlapping with the film but also including additional stories.

=== Girlfriend ===
Melaniya Podolyak, a Ukrainian political consultant, activist and the Serhiy Prytula Charity Foundation project coordinator, YouTuber and Twitter blogger, tweeted photos of "Juice" including their selfies together, revealing that she was the girlfriend of Andrii Pilshchykov. She had interviewed "Juice" months earlier for the Toronto Television.

=== Mother ===
On 27 August 2023, Liliya Averyanova, a Ukrainian research scientist, the mother of Pilshchykov, and Melaniya Podolyak announced that the All-Ukrainian Charitable Foundation "Neopalyma Kupyna", supporting Ukrainian pilots, whose work Andrii had been actively involved with, would be renamed in his honor. On the same day Ukrainian military journalist and video producer Vasyl Khmelevskyi, a retired deputy head of the Central Television and Radio Studio of the Ministry of Defense of Ukraine, who documented Ukrainian Air Force's history for years, shared a 4-minute-long video clip combined from L-39C's cockpit videos captured during training flights, noting that “this video has been recorded and edited by Andrii in 2015”.

A cockpit view photo of L-39C, Andrii flew during this training flights, dated August 2015, has been uploaded to the Ukrainian Spotter's Site on 12 August 2015. Air-to-air photo of L-39C (tail number "103 BLUE"), appeared in the video, and dated August 2015, has been uploaded on 7 August 2016 as a greeting card for the Day of the Air Force of the Armed Forces of Ukraine. Air-to-air photo of L-39C (tail number "08 WHITE"), appeared in the video, also dated August 2015, has been uploaded on 3 July 2019 with a next comment: “It's a pity for the bird, but it's good that the cadet is safe and didn't touch anything on the ground.”, referencing this plane crash incident that happen during training flight on 2 July 2019 near Starovirivka.

On 6 September 2023, Liliya Averyanova has been interviewed by Radio NV. She described root causes of problems in the Ukrainian Air Force, such as bureaucracy and meaningless ambitions of the generals, that demotivated pilots for years and resulted in mass resignations from the Air Force in 2021. She emphasized the importance reforming the Air Force following "Juice's List", in particular introducing modern Western standards and doing away with old Soviet traditions.

=== Toponym ===
In April 2024 the city of Kharkiv (re)named a road known as Trinkler entry road to Juice’s Glissade (the term "glissade" describes the path of a landing plane) in Pilshchykov's honour.

== Awards ==
- Titled Hero of Ukraine with the Order of the Golden Star (September 30, 2024, posthumously)
- Order for Courage, 2nd class (28 September 2023, posthumously)
- Order for Courage, 3rd class (2 May 2022)

== See also ==
- Ghost of Kyiv
- Valerii Liakhov (author of Ukrainian Air Force's heraldry and patches)
- Pilot class qualification
- List of aircraft losses during the Russo-Ukrainian War
- Dmytro Fisher (ex-deputy commander of the 40th TAB)
- Anton Lystopad
- Mykhailo Matiushenko (Did, Дід in Ukrainian, meaning Grandfather)
- Moonfish (pilot)
- Oleksandr Oksanchenko (Grey Wolf)
- Vladyslav Savieliev (Nomad)
- Stepan Tarabalka
- Vadym Voroshylov (Karaya)
