= Vladyslav Savieliev =

Ukrainian fighter pilot (1996–2023)

- Владислав Савєльєв
- Born: Vladyslav Mykhailovych Savieliev; August 14, 1996; Kropyvnytskyi, Ukraine
- Died: June 2, 2023 (aged 26) near the town of Pokrovsk, Donetsk Oblast
- Alma mater: Ivan Kozhedub National Air Force University
- Military career
- Allegiance: Ukraine
- Branch: Ukrainian Air Force; 114th Tactical Aviation Brigade
- Service years: 2014–2023
- Rank: Major
- Nickname: Nomad (Номад)
- Conflicts: Russo-Ukrainian War
- Awards: Order of Bohdan Khmelnytsky 3rd class

Vladyslav Mykhailovych Savieliev (Ukrainian: Владислав Михайлович Савєльєв, (August 14, 1996 — 2 June 2023, near Pokrovsk, Donetsk Oblast) was a Ukrainian military pilot of the Air Force of the Armed Forces of Ukraine, Major, a participant in the Russian-Ukrainian war, who died during the Russian invasion of Ukraine.

== Early life and education ==
He was born on August 14, 1996 in the city of Kropyvnytskyi in a family of military personnel. He graduated from gymnasium No. 9 in Kropyvnytskyi and then studied at the Ivan Kozhedub National Air Force University, graduating with honors in 2019.

== Military career and death ==
Savieliev participated in the Joint Forces Operation in eastern Ukraine.

For two years, Savieliev took a basic flight training course on the T-6A Texan II turboprop trainer at Columbus Air Force Base.

During the Russian invasion of Ukraine, he was a fighter pilot with the 40th Tactical Aviation Brigade. On the morning of 2 June 2023, together with Andrii Pilshchykov (Juice), he flew a successful combat sortie in the east, launching AGM-88 HARM missiles. Savieliev flew another combat mission in the evening, this time using JDAM guided bombs. However, in the area of Pokrovsk (Donetsk Oblast), his plane was shot down by an enemy anti-aircraft missile, and he was killed.

He is survived by his daughter, wife and parents.

On 7 June 2023, a memorial ceremony for Vladyslav Savieliev was held on the Alley of Honorary Military Burials in Kropyvnytskyi, where he was then buried. On 15 August 2023, the Ukrainian Air Force Command shared on Facebook details on Savieliev's last flight, and photos of a piano burning ceremony, with a piano painted with Savieliev's call sign and a number "12" (tail number of his MiG-29).

Piano burning

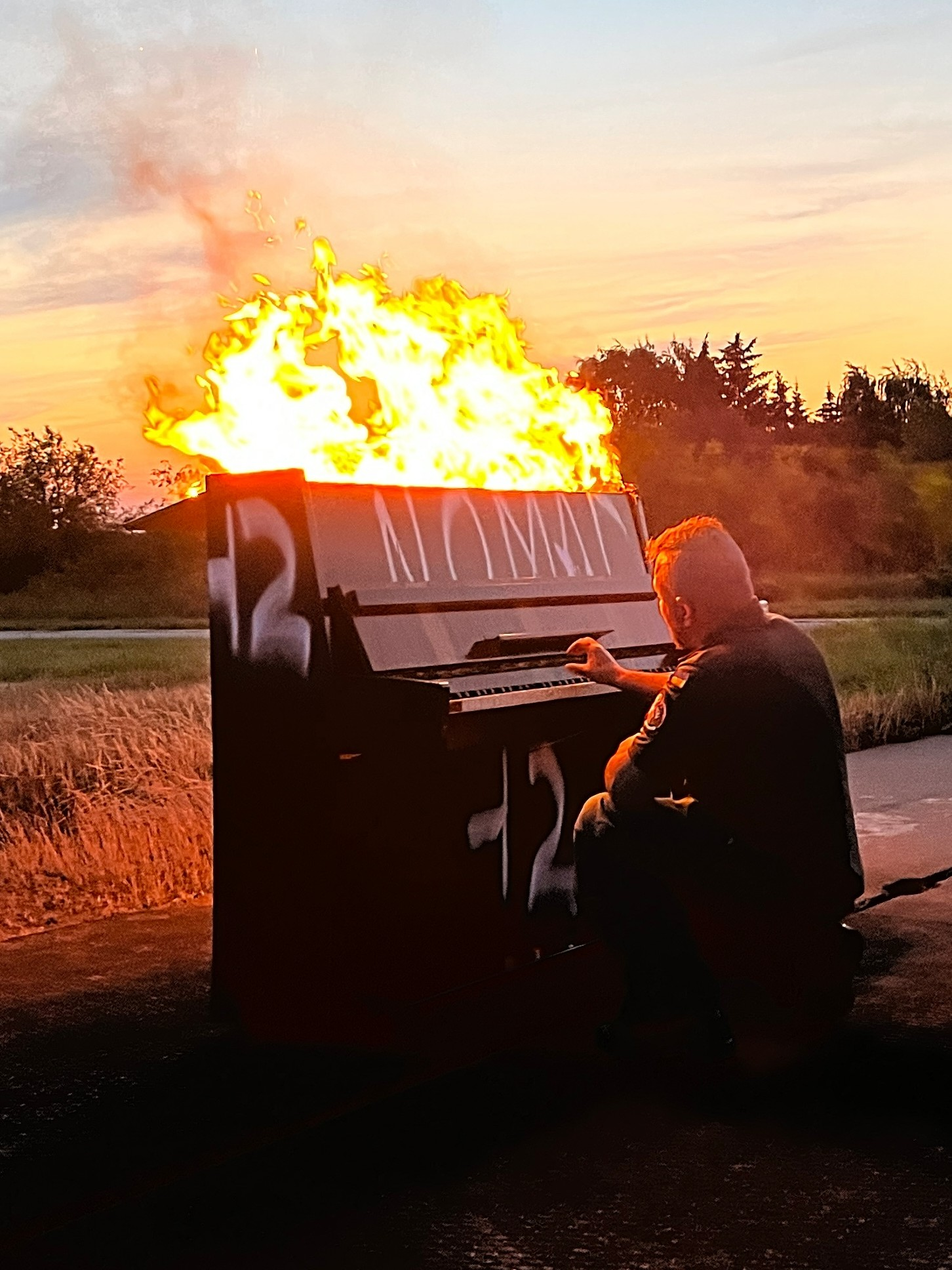

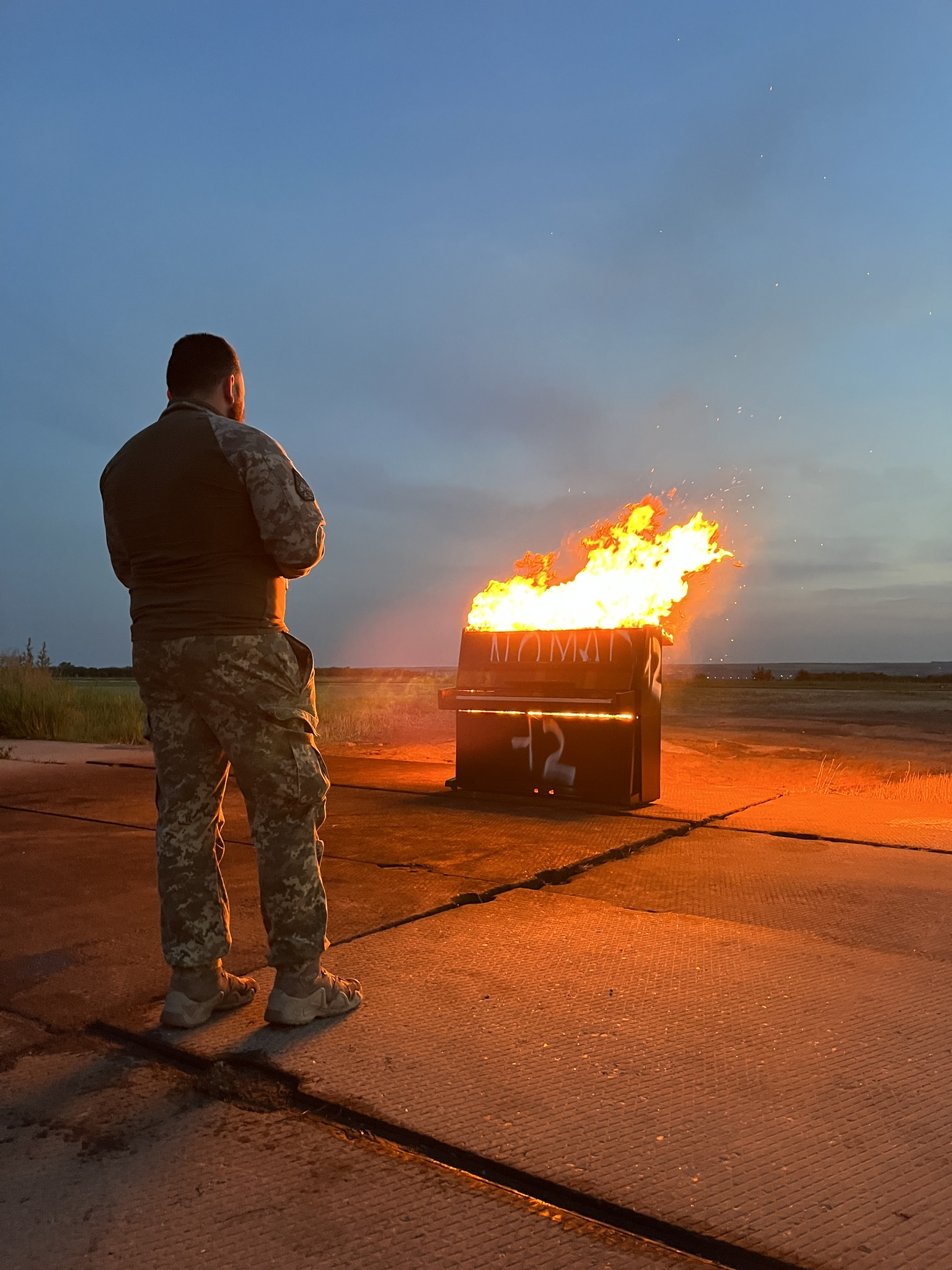

== Awards ==
- Order of Bohdan Khmelnytskyi, III class (4 August 2023, posthumously)

== See also ==
- Oleksii Mes (Moonfish)
- Andrii Pilshchykov (Juice)
- Oleksandr Oksanchenko (Grey wolf)
- Anton Lystopad
- Mykhailo Matiushenko
- Stepan Tarabalka
- List of aircraft losses during the Russo-Ukrainian War
