= Piano burning =

Instrument destruction type

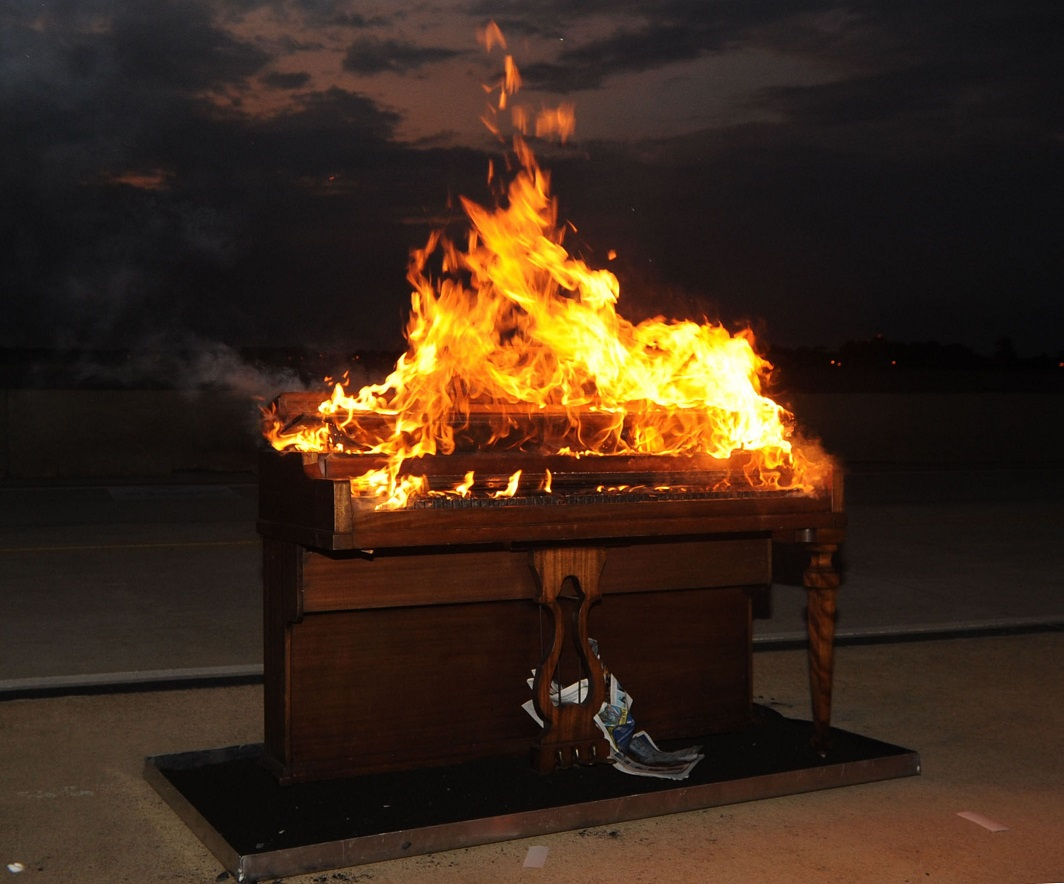
Piano burning ceremony at Langley Air Force Base, celebrating the 94th anniversary of the 94th Fighter Squadron, 19 August 2011.

Piano burning is the act of setting on fire an acoustic piano, most commonly an upright, as either a ceremony or a form of performance art.

Piano burning ceremonies are held by air forces around the world, including the Royal Air Force, Royal Canadian Air Force and the United States Air Force, to commemorate deaths and other events.

Several contemporary musicians, including Annea Lockwood, Yōsuke Yamashita, and Diego Stocco, have composed for and performed on pianos which have been deliberately set alight. A burning piano was the centrepiece of Douglas Gordon's 2012 video installation, The End of Civilisation.

== Ceremonial piano burning ==
In The Phantom in Focus: A Navigator's Eye on Britain's Cold War Warrior, David Gledhill recounts a combat training exercise in Germany during the Cold War where Jaguar pilots from RAF Wildenrath and RAF Bruggen had the task of destroying a piano placed on Nordhorn Ridge with a single practice bomb. Because the target was so small, it was only the last Jaguar on the last flight of the exercise that finally managed to hit it. The pilots from both bases celebrated that evening at RAF Wildenrath by burning a second piano in the Officers' Mess. Although piano burning has become popular with air forces and especially the Royal Air Force since World War II, its origin is undocumented and has been the subject of myth and decades of storytelling.

One of the most common legends traces its origin to the British Royal Air Force sometime between World War I and II, when so many pilots died during World War I that the RAF was forced to select its pilots from the common population, instead of their usual preference for upper-class families. Attempts were made to educate the pilots on refined manners and tastes, but these lessons became very unpopular among the pilots, especially the piano lessons which the Royal Air Force believed would increase the pilots' level of culture and improve their dexterity. According to this story, the burning began at RAF Leuchars, where the only piano at the base burned down accidentally and piano lessons were cancelled. Word spread, and soon pilots at more Royal Air Force bases began to burn the pianos to avoid lessons.

Another origin story holds that RAF piano burning began as a tribute to fallen airmen. According to the New Zealand Herald, a piano-playing pilot in the Royal Air Force during World War II played to his fellow airmen each time one of their number had been killed. When he himself was killed in action, his comrades decided that "if he couldn't play the piano any more, nobody would, so they dragged it outside and set it alight."

Piano burning ceremonies based on the RAF tradition are held by the US Air Force. A piano was ceremonially burnt at Langley Air Force Base in 2011 to celebrate the 94th anniversary of the 94th Fighter Squadron. At Seymour Johnson Air Force Base, the 4th Fighter Wing burns a piano each year in commemoration of the Battle of Britain. Vance Air Force Base sometimes celebrates the graduation of trainee pilots with a piano burning.

Although piano burning ceremonies are primarily carried out by the UK and US air forces, the Roxbury Tavern near Sauk City, Wisconsin has held an annual piano burning ceremony since 2004 to mark the Summer Solstice. A eulogy for the piano is delivered prior to it being set alight, and afterwards its remains are placed on display in the tavern's garden, along with those of burnt pianos from previous years.

=== People commemorated ===
Andrii Pilshchykov, a Ukrainian Air Force fighter pilot who died in an accident, was commemorated in a piano burning ceremony in August 2023.

On 15 August 2023, the Air Force Command of the Armed Forces of Ukraine shared photos of piano burning ceremony as a tribute to Ukrainian fighter pilot Vladyslav Savieliev, who died in action during the Russo-Ukrainian War. Savieliev's call sign ("Nomad") and a tail number of his MiG-29 ("12") was painted on a piano.

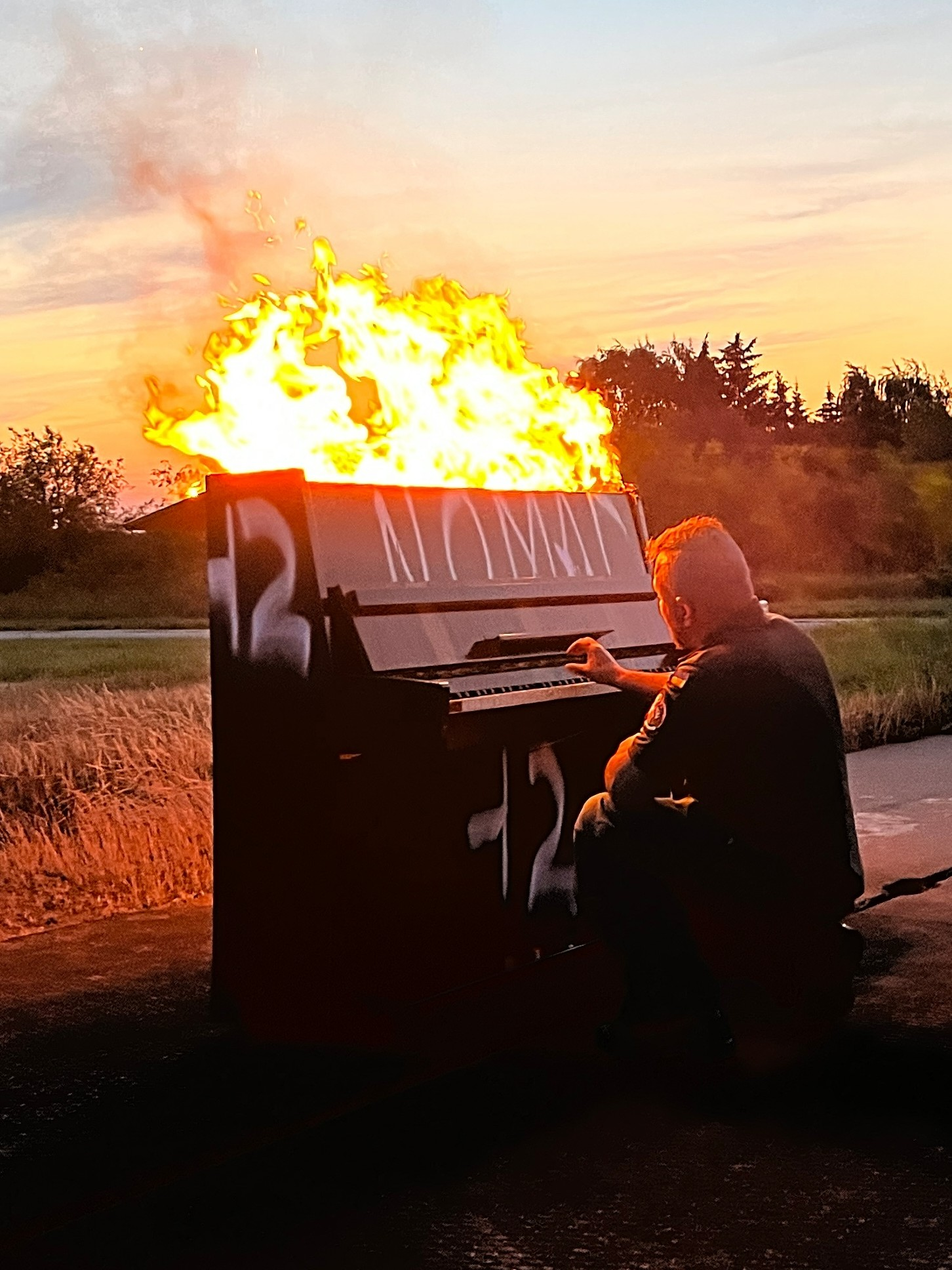

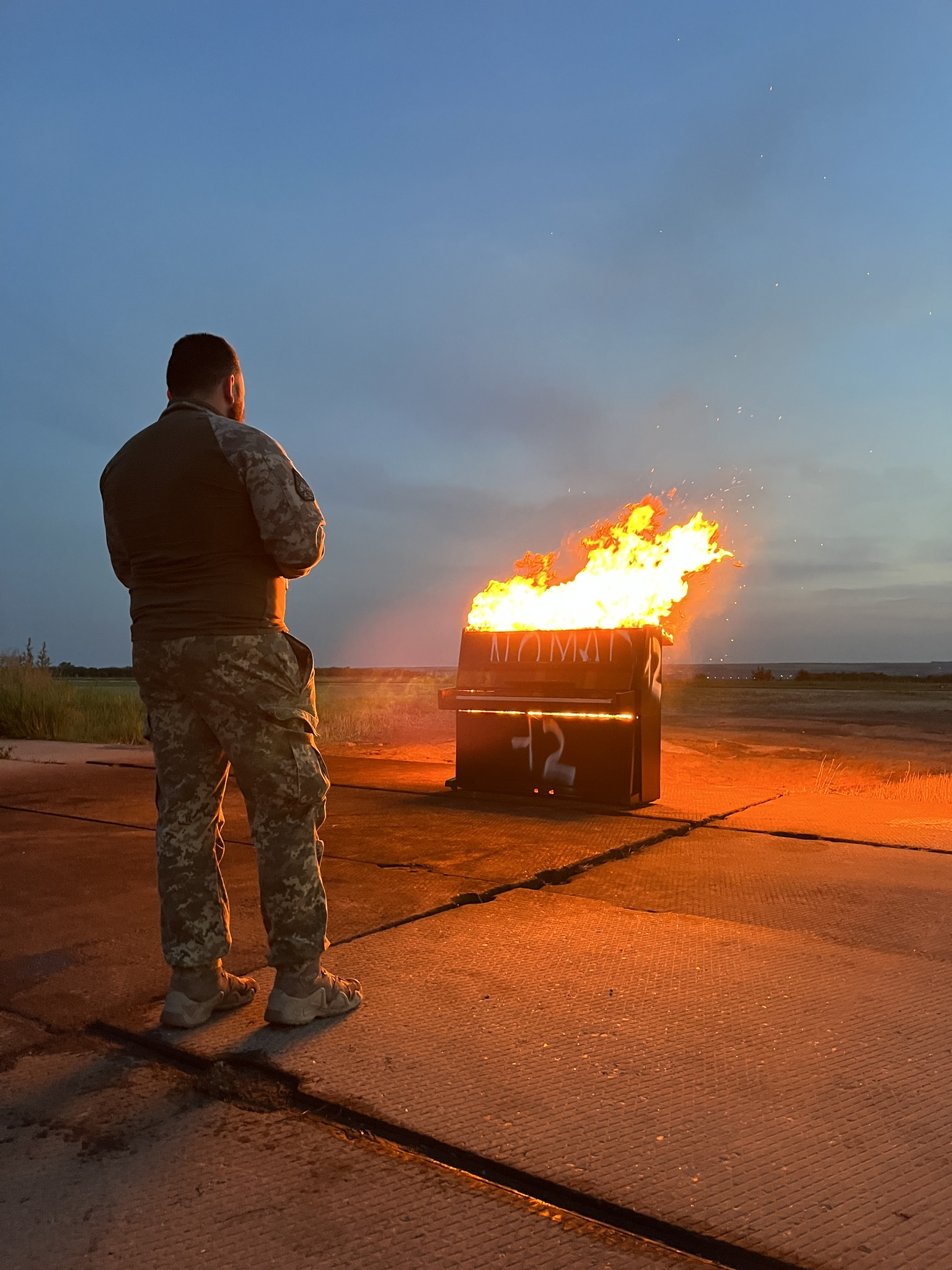

On 26 August 2023, the Ukrainian Air Force held a piano burning ceremony for three pilots killed in the line of duty day earlier. One of the dead, Major Andrii Pilshchykov, had been an advocate for incorporating NATO standards and traditions into Ukraine, including the burning of pianos to honor fallen pilots. The two other pilots were Major Viacheslav Minka and Major Serhii Prokazin. Pilots' nicknames and both planes' tail numbers were painted on a piano: "102 Minka" (for L-39M1 "102 BLUE"), "Prokazin" and "107 Juice" (for L-39M1 "107 BLUE").

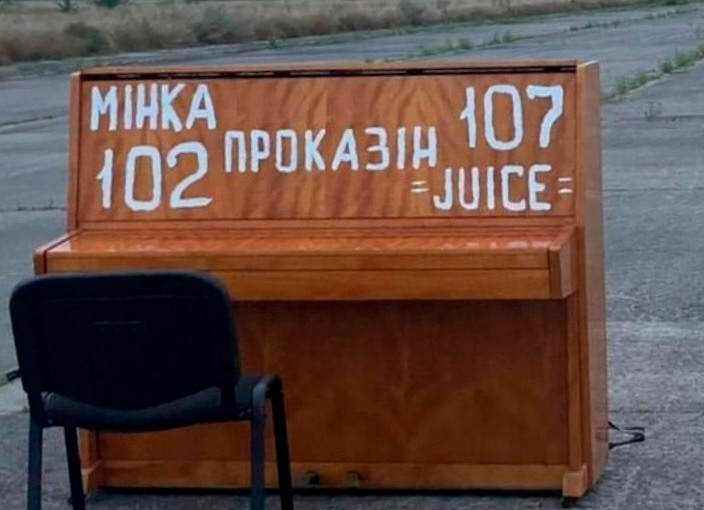

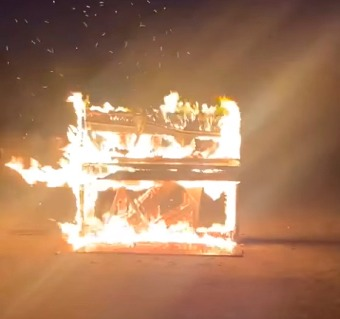

Avatar of 831 st tactical aviation brigade

831 st tactical aviation brigade
(@831TABr)
tweeted:

ПІД МУЗИКУ ПАЛАЮЧОГО ФОРПЕПІАНО…🎹 Українські пілоти вшанували пам'ять своїх бойових побратимів.
Назавжди в строю! 🫡✈️🇺🇦 @PvK_Center_UA @KpsZSU pic.twitter.com/jxK9KBt4Bx

Translation:

UNDER THE MUSIC OF BURNING FORTEPIANO...🎹 Ukrainian pilots honored the memory of their fighting brothers. Forever in order! 🫡✈️🇺🇦 @PvK_Center_UA @KpsZSU pic.twitter.com/jxK9KBt4Bx

29 August 2023

On 27 August 2023, the Ukrainian Air Force held a burial and a piano burning ceremony for Denys Kyryliuk, a pilot in the 831st Tactical Aviation Brigade, who was killed in the line of duty on 28 March 2023 in Chernihiv Oblast. This piano burning also commemorated Stepan Chobanu and Oleksandr Oksanchenko, two other pilots of the 831st TBA, who were killed in action in the early days of the Russian invasion of Ukraine. On video of the ceremony shared by the 831st TBA showed a piano with painted pilots' nicknames, and planes' tail numbers: "11 Chobanu" (for Su-27S "11 BLUE"), "30 Kyryliuk" (for Su-27S "30 BLUE") and "100 Oksanchenko" (for Su-27P "100 BLUE").

Gail Peck, a Retired Colonel in the United States Air Force, was memorialized with a piano burning in November 2024 near Las Vegas, Nevada.

US Air Force personnel at Langley Air Force Base performed a piano burning in April 2025 for aerobatic champion pilot Rob Holland, who died in an accident while arriving to perform at an airshow on the base.

== Compositions for burning pianos ==
=== Annea Lockwood ===
In 1968, New Zealand composer Annea Lockwood wrote a piece called Piano Burning. The score specifies that the performer uses an upright piano that is beyond repair. In the composer's words,

Piano burning should really be done with an upright piano; the structure is much more beautiful than that of a grand when you watch it burn. The piano must always be one that's irretrievable, that nobody could work on, that no tuner or rebuilder could possibly bring back. It's got to be a truly defunct piano.

She asks the performer to soak paper in lighter fluid, set it alight, and drop it into the piano. She also specifies that balloons may be attached, and the piano may be played for as long as the performer is able. Piano Burning is a part of her Piano Transplants series, which also includes Piano Drowning, Piano Garden, and Southern Exposure.

Experimental trio Clipping performed a version of this composition as the closing track to their 2019 album There Existed an Addiction to Blood.

=== Yōsuke Yamashita ===
Yōsuke Yamashita first performed on a burning piano in 1973, when asked by Japanese graphic designer Kiyoshi Awazu to be the subject in his short film, burning piano. 35 years later, at the age of 66, Yamashita re-watched the film and was inspired to repeat the performance. Dressed in a protective firefighter's uniform, Yamashita improvised on the burning piano during sunset on a beach in western Japan. He said of the experience,

I did not think I was risking my life but I was almost suffocating from the smoke that was continuously getting into my eyes and nose. I had decided to keep on playing until the piano stopped making sounds, so though I did not mean it but it ended up having a life-or-death battle between the piano and myself."

The pianos used for both of Yamashita's performances were donated, decade-old broken ones.

=== Diego Stocco ===
Diego Stocco composed a piece called The Burning Piano, which is made up entirely of his recordings of a burning piano. Stocco began the burning process by pointing a butane lighter directly towards the strings and played single notes, and after the flame was extinguished he played with what remained. He recorded the entire process and later rearranged samples to create the piece of music. The Spectrasonics virtual instrument Omnisphere includes a Burning Piano sample recorded by Stocco.

=== Michael Hannan ===
Michael Hannan's compositions have often involved pieces for pianos which have been altered in some way, including being set on fire. His 2003 Burning Questions, a radiophonic work commissioned by ABC Radio National, explored the "cultural politics of auto-destructive music" and included the sounds of a burning baby grand piano (with a microphone placed inside), the observers' reactions, and Hannan playing Beethoven's Moonlight Sonata on the piano immediately prior to setting it alight. According to Hannan:

The act of burning a piano [...] stimulates a strong emotional response from an audience. I became more interested in the crowd's response than in the sounds made from the piano itself.

The piano burning which forms the basis of the work had taken place on 2 October 1999 at Bellingen, New South Wales. The composer Barry Conyngham, one of the observers at the burning, was heard to remark that he found "burning a perfectly good microphone more sacrilegious than burning a piano."

== Piano burning as visual art ==
=== Arman ===
The destruction of musical instruments, often by fire, was a recurrent theme in Arman's work. Two of his most notable works involving piano burning were his 1965 Piano de Néron (Nero's Piano) and his 1966 Piano Flamboyant (Flaming Piano). The burning for Piano Flamboyant took place on the roof of Arman's atelier in Nice and was filmed for a documentary by Gérard Patris which was later broadcast on French national television. As with his other burnt instrument works, which also included violins, cellos, and guitars, the charred remains were then mounted on panels or enclosed in plexiglas. One of Arman's earliest works of piano destruction was his 1962 Chopin's Waterloo which took at the Galerie Saqqârah in Gstaad. On that occasion rather than burning the piano, the artist hacked it to pieces with an axe.

=== Chiharu Shiota ===
Several of Chiharu Shiota's installations have featured a piano which she had set alight with the charred remains then displayed in an installation of black thread. As part of the 2011 MONA FOMA arts festival, Shiota set the piano alight on a street in Hobart, Tasmania. According to Shiota, the inspiration came from a childhood experience when she saw a charred piano amidst the ruins of a neighbour's house which had burnt down in the night.

=== Douglas Gordon ===
Douglas Gordon's 2012 video installation The End of Civilisation was centred on a burning grand piano placed in the isolated landscape of Cumbria on the border between Scotland and England. According to Gordon:

A piano started to represent for me the ultimate symbol of western civilisation. Not only is it an instrument, it's a beautiful object that works as a sculpture but it has another function entirely.

The work, displayed simultaneously on multiple screens, consists of close-up film of the burning piano from the moment it is set alight until it is reduced to ashes juxtaposed with a second film which is a 360 degree pan of the Scottish Borders landscape surrounding the piano. After its premiere at the Tyne Theatre and Opera House in July 2012, The End of Civilisation was shown at the London 2012 Festival and toured as part of a Douglas Gordon retrospective in Tel Aviv followed by screenings in Venice, New York, and Berlin.

=== Philip Labes & Jacob Reed ===
Director and visual artist Jacob Reed's 2022 video for Philip Labes song something to believe culminates with the burning of the piano Philip has been playing throughout the song. The chorus of the song is about protestors who have performed self-immolation to protest climate change.
