= Anton Lystopad =

Ukrainian military pilot

- Антон Листопад
- Born: Anton Valentynovych Lystopad; 17 September 1991; Arkhangelsk Oblast, Russia
- Died: 7 August 2022 (aged 30)
- Education: Ivano-Frankivsk National Technical University of Oil and Gas, Ivan Kozhedub National Air Force University
- Military career
- Allegiance: Ukraine
- Branch: Ukrainian Air Force
- Service years: 2010–2022
- Rank: Major
- Conflicts: Russo-Ukrainian War
- Awards: Order for Courage; Medal For Military Service to Ukraine

Anton Valentynovych Lystopad (Ukrainian: Антон Валентинович Листопад, 17 September 1991, Arkhangelsk Oblast, Russia - 7 August 2022) was a Ukrainian serviceman, major, military pilot 2nd class, flying the MiG-29 in the 204th Tactical Aviation Brigade of the Air Force of the Armed Forces of Ukraine. He fought in the Russo-Ukrainian war.

== Biography ==
Anton Lystopad was born on 17 September 1991 in the Arkhangelsk Oblast, Russia. His father is the military pilot Valentyn Lystopad, who, as of August 2022, holds the rank of Major General and is the Deputy Commander of the Air Force of the Armed Forces of Ukraine.

He studied at Ivano-Frankivsk Secondary School No. 2 and the Physical and Technical Lyceum of the Ivano-Frankivsk Regional Council (2008). He took part in six-day local history practices and incentive trips for the most successful lyceum students of the Lviv-2006, Makivka-2007, and Hoverla-2007 courses; all country trips as part of the academic group and all sports events at the lyceum.

He later graduated from Ivano-Frankivsk National Technical University of Oil and Gas. In 2010, he signed a contract with the Armed Forces of Ukraine. Two years later, he applied for admission to the Ivan Kozhedub National Air Force University, graduating in 2018 with the rank of 2nd class military pilot, senior lieutenant.

He served in the 204th Tactical Aviation Brigade. In 2019, he was recognized as the best pilot of the Air Force of the Armed Forces of Ukraine. In 2021, he was the leader of the aviation group of the air column of the parade of troops in honor of the 30th anniversary of Ukraine's independence.

He was a participant of the Joint Forces Operation. In the first hours of the full-scale Russian invasion of Ukraine, he managed to withdraw his own MiG-29 fighter jet from enemy fire.

He was awarded the Order for Courage, III class, which was presented to him a few days before his death by the President of Ukraine Volodymyr Zelenskyy.

He died on 7 August 2022. He was buried on 15 August 2022 on the Walk of Fame in the village of Chukalivka, Ivano-Frankivsk Oblast. He is survived by his parents and wife.

== Awards ==
- Order for Courage, III class (17 June 2022).
- Medal For Military Service to Ukraine (17 August 2022, posthumously).

== Military ranks ==
- Major (2022, posthumously)
- Captain

== See also ==
- Andrii Pilshchykov (Juice)
- Oleksandr Oksanchenko (Grey wolf)
- Mykhailo Matiushenko
- Stepan Tarabalka
- Ghost of Kyiv
