= Oleksandr Oksanchenko =

Ukrainian fighter pilot and politician (1968–2022)

- Олександр Оксанченко
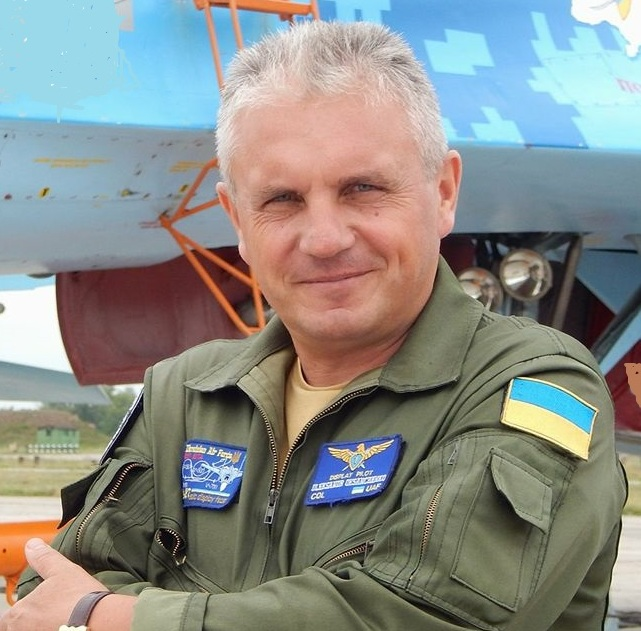
- Born: Oleksandr Yakovych Oksanchenko; 26 April 1968; Malomykhailivka, Dnipropetrovsk Oblast, Ukrainian SSR, USSR
- Died: 25 February 2022 (aged 53); Kyiv, Ukraine
- Alma mater: Kharkiv Higher Military Aviation School of Pilots
- Children: 2
- Military career
- Allegiance: Soviet Union (1989–1991); Ukraine (1991–2018, 2022)
- Branch: Soviet Air Forces; Ukrainian Air Force
- Service years: 1989–2018; 2022
- Rank: Colonel (Polkovnyk)
- Nickname: Grey Wolf
- Unit: 831st Tactical Aviation Brigade
- Conflicts: Russo-Ukrainian War; Annexation of Crimea; Russian invasion of Ukraine; Battle of Kyiv †
- Awards: Order of Danylo Halytsky; Order of the Gold Star (posthumously)

Oleksandr Yakovych Oksanchenko (Ukrainian: Олександр Якович Оксанченко; 26 April 1968 – 25 February 2022), nicknamed the Grey Wolf, was a Ukrainian fighter pilot and city councilor in Myrhorod. He was a colonel in the Ukrainian Air Force who won awards in several air shows before retiring in 2018. In 2022, he returned to resist the Russian invasion of Ukraine, and was killed by a Russian S-400 missile during the battle of Kyiv. He was posthumously awarded the Order of Gold Star.

== Early life ==
Oksanchenko was born 26 April 1968 in the village of Malomykhailivka, Pokrovske Raion in Dnipropetrovsk Oblast and attended his local secondary school until 1985 before commencing military aviation training. He graduated from the Kharkiv Higher Military Aviation School of Pilots.

== Career ==
Oksanchenko joined the Soviet Air Force in 1989. He worked as an instructor pilot, later rising to the position of deputy commander responsible for flight training of his unit. During the annexation of Crimea by the Russian Federation, he was stationed at Belbek Air Base and was in combat in Crimea and the Anti-Terrorist Operation Zone.

From 2013 to 2018, Oksanchenko was a display pilot of the Sukhoi Su-27 for the Ukrainian Air Force, logging over 2,000 flying hours. In 2016, he flew in the Malta International Airshow. He was the winner of the 2016 Slovak International Air Fest and was presented with a trophy from the Slovak Air Force commander. In 2016, Oksanchenko was honored as the Myrhorod person of the year. In 2017, he won the As the Crow Flies Award for the best display at the Royal International Air Tattoo. In 2018, he won best pilot at the Czech International Air Fest. Oksanchenko was a colonel when he retired in 2018.

He was a member of the Strength and Honor (Ukrainian: Сила і Честь) party in Poltava Oblast. Starting in November 2020, he served as one of the deputies in the Myrhorod city council.

Oksanchenko came out of retirement and resumed active duty during the 2022 Russian invasion of Ukraine. On the night of 25 February 2022, he was killed by a missile while defending the skies over Kyiv.

== Personal life ==
Oksanchenko had two daughters.

== Legacy ==
Avatar of 831 st tactical aviation brigade

831 st tactical aviation brigade
(@831TABr)
tweeted:

ПІД МУЗИКУ ПАЛАЮЧОГО ФОРПЕПІАНО…🎹 Українські пілоти вшанували пам’ять своїх бойових побратимів.
Назавжди в строю! 🫡✈️🇺🇦 @PvK_Center_UA @KpsZSU pic.twitter.com/jxK9KBt4Bx

Translation:

UNDER THE MUSIC OF BURNING FORTEPIANO...🎹 Ukrainian pilots honored the memory of their fighting brothers. Forever in order! 🫡✈️🇺🇦 @PvK_Center_UA @KpsZSU pic.twitter.com/jxK9KBt4Bx

29 August 2023

On 29 August 2023, the Air Force Command of the Armed Forces of Ukraine shared a video of piano burning ceremony has been held as a tribute to fallen Ukrainian fighter pilot Denys Kyryliuk and commemorated to Stepan Chobanu and Oleksandr Oksanchenko. On video of the ceremony shared by 831st TBA shown a piano with painted pilots' nicknames and planes' tail numbers as next: "11 Chobanu" (for Su-27S "11 BLUE"), "30 Kyryliuk" (for Su-27S "30 BLUE") and "100 Oksanchenko" (for Su-27P "100 BLUE").

== Awards ==
Oksanchenko was a recipient of the Order of Danylo Halytsky. He was posthumously awarded the Order of Gold Star by Ukrainian president Volodymyr Zelenskyy.

== See also ==
- Ghost of Kyiv
- List of aircraft losses during the Russo-Ukrainian War
- Dmytro Fisher
- Denys Kyryliuk
- Anton Lystopad
- Mykhailo Matiushenko
- Oleksii Mes (Moonfish)
- Andrii Pilshchykov (Juice)
- Vladyslav Savieliev (Nomad)
- Vadym Voroshylov (Karaya)
