= Vadym Voroshylov =

Ukrainian military pilot

- Вадим Олександрович Ворошилов
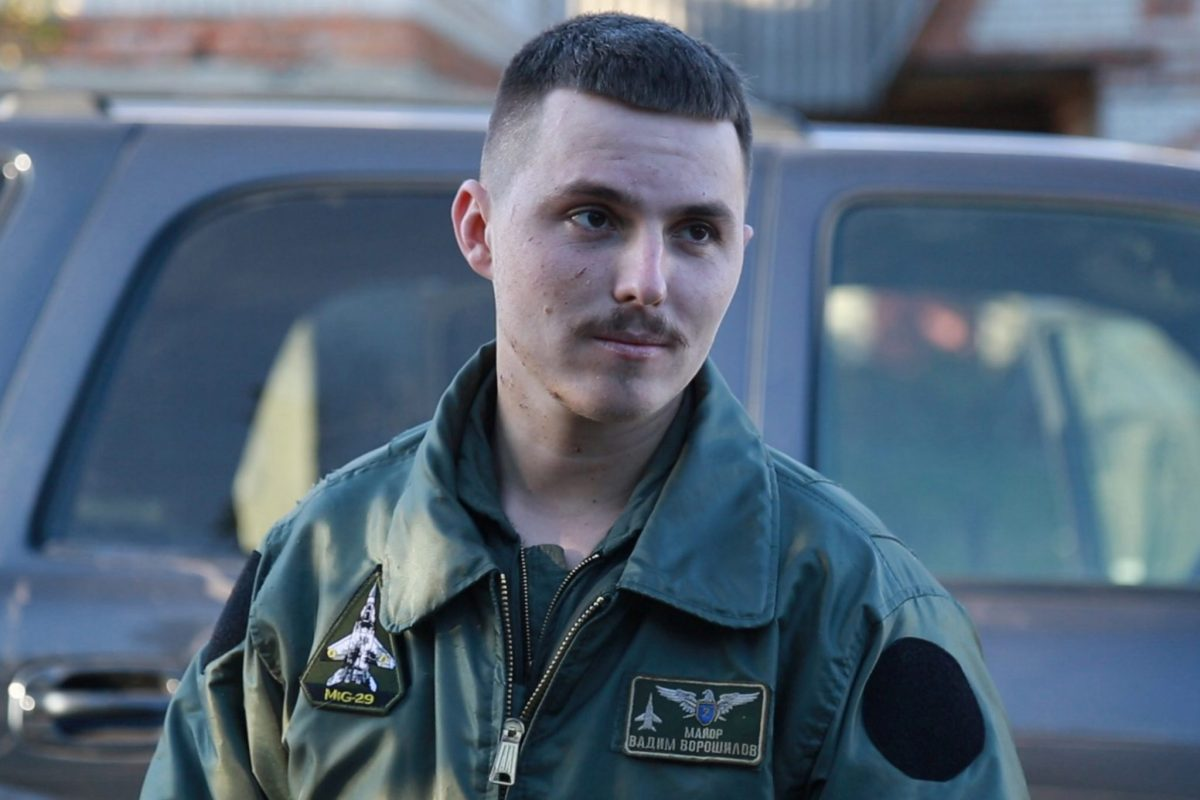
- Born: Vadym Oleksandrovych Voroshylov; February 2, 1994 (age 32); Kremenchuk, Poltava Oblast, Ukraine
- Alma mater: Ivan Kozhedub National Air Force University
- Military career
- Allegiance: Ukraine
- Branch: Ukrainian Air Force
- Rank: Major
- Nicknames: Karaya; Ghost of Vinnytsia
- Conflicts: Russo-Ukrainian War; 2022 Russian invasion of Ukraine
- Awards: Order of the Gold Star

Vadym Oleksandrovych Voroshylov (Ukrainian: Вадим Олександрович Ворошилов; callsign "Karaya"; 2 February 1994) is a fighter pilot of the Ukrainian Air Force, and a recipient of the Hero of Ukraine award.

== Biography ==
In 2011, he graduated from the Kremenchuk Military Lyceum, and in 2015 he graduated (with honors; specialty — Military Administration (Air Force) and in 2016 he earned a (Master's degree, with honors, specialty — management of aviation units) from the Ivan Kozhedub National Air Force University.

After graduation, he was assigned to the 204th Tactical Aviation Brigade, where he served as a pilot (2016–2018), senior pilot (2018–2020) of the aviation link of the aviation squadron and head of the flight safety service (2020–2021).

In 2017, he became the best young pilot of the South Air Command.

In 2020, following the results of flight competitions, he was named the "Best Fighter Crew of the Air Force of Ukraine".

In 2021, at the end of his contract, he resigned from the Armed Forces of Ukraine. He worked as a senior aviation chief at a civilian airfield.

=== Russian invasion of Ukraine (2022) ===
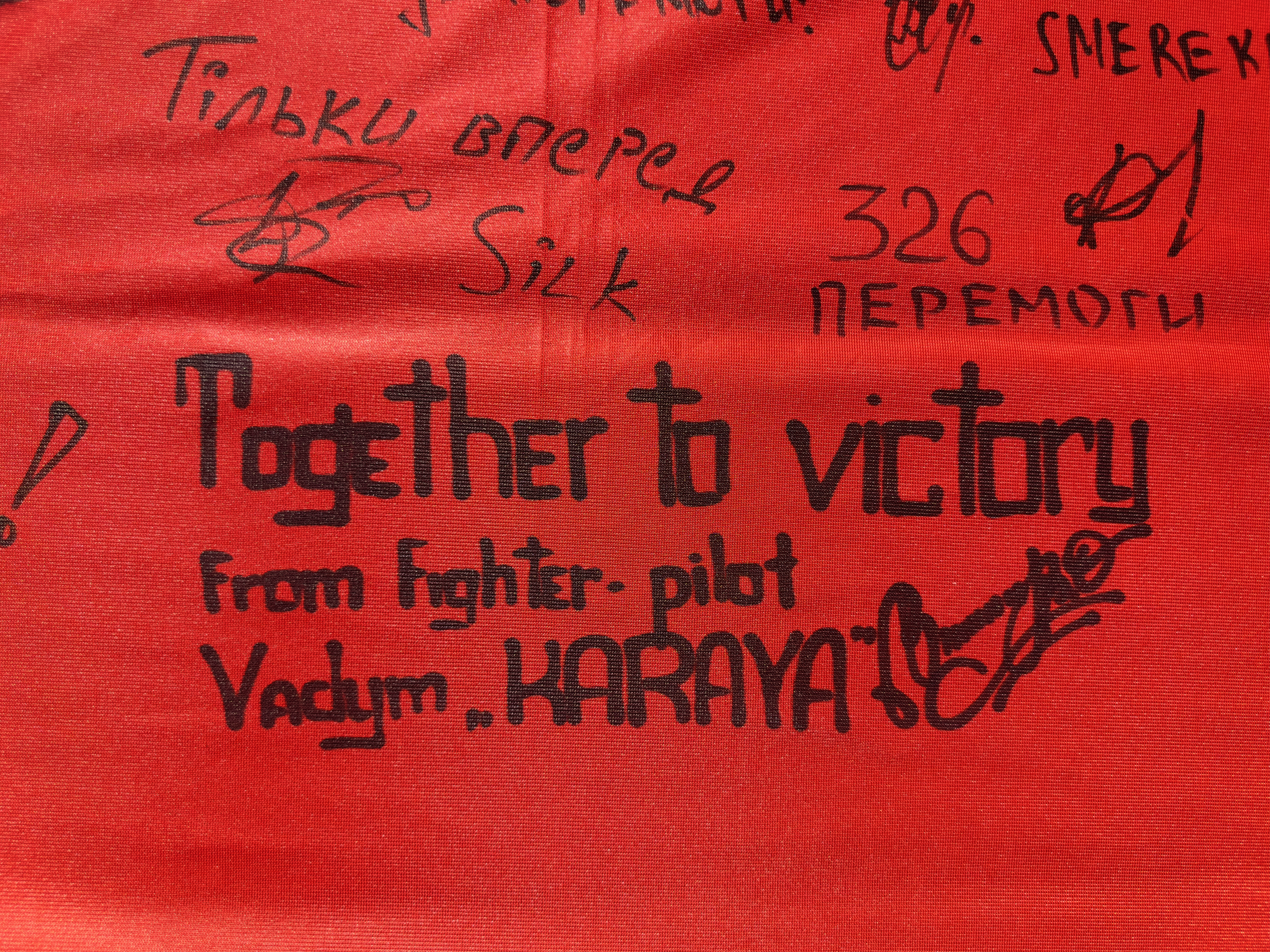
Together to victory (April 7, 2023)

On February 24, 2022, after the start of Russia's full-scale invasion of Ukraine, he resumed his service.

At first, he flew missions over the Zhytomyr Oblast. After that, he flew over the Izyum and eastern directions, and later over the Kherson Oblast.

On October 10, during a massive missile attack, he shot down two Russian cruise missiles.

On October 12, according to Ukrainian officials he destroyed five Shahed 136 drones: three in southern Ukraine and two over Vinnytsia. Due to the damage to his fighter aircraft, a MiG-29, Voroshylov ejected over the Vinnytsia region, having previously diverted the fighter jet from a settlement. He received the Hero of Ukraine award for his actions, and acquired the nickname "Ghost of Vinnytsia".

== Awards ==
- Hero of Ukraine (2022)
- Order for Courage, III class (2022)

== See also ==
- Oleksii Mes (Moonfish)
- Oleksandr Oksanchenko (Grey wolf)
- Andrii Pilshchykov (Juice)
- List of aircraft losses during the Russo-Ukrainian War
- Ghost of Kyiv
