= 40th Tactical Aviation Brigade =

Military unit of the Ukrainian Air Force

- 40-ва бригада тактичної авіації
- Active: 1940 – present
- Country: Ukraine; Soviet Union (1940–1991)
- Allegiance: Armed Forces of Ukraine
- Branch: Ukrainian Air Force
- Type: Air Force Aviation
- Role: Fighter
- Size: Brigade
- Part of: Air Command Center
- Garrison/HQ: Vasylkiv Air Base, Kyiv Oblast
- Nickname: Ghost of Kyiv
- Engagements: Russo-Ukrainian war: War in Donbas; Battle of Debaltseve; Full scale invasion; Battle of Kyiv (2022); Snake Island campaign
- Decorations: For Courage and Bravery
- Website: Official Facebook page

Commanders
- Current commander: Colonel Volodymyr Kravchenko

Insignia
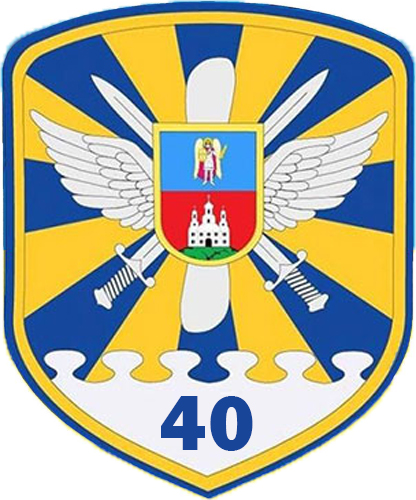
- Former Insignia

- Roundel

- Fin flash

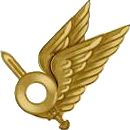
- Aviation branch insignia collar

Aircraft flown
- Fighter: MiG-29, MiG-29UB, MiG-29M1
- Trainer: L39M1

The 40th Tactical Aviation Brigade Ghost of Kyiv (MUN А1789) is a formation of the Ukrainian Air Force, composed primarily of Mikoyan MiG-29 aircraft, that is based at Vasylkiv.

== History ==
In January 1992 the 92nd Fighter Aviation Regiment took the oath of loyalty to the Ukrainian people, later becoming the 40th Tactical Aviation Brigade.

=== Russo-Ukrainian war ===
Upon the start of the Full scale invasion in 2022, the Brigade played an important role in the Kyiv offensive. Its fighter aircraft battled the Russian Air Force over Kyiv and attempted to disrupt Russian advances on the ground. The unit took part in the Battle of Antonov Airport and the Battle of Kyiv; one of its pilots, Lt. Col. Vyacheslav Yerko (posthumously Hero of Ukraine, Gold Star Order), reportedly shot down four Russian aircraft on the invasion's first day before being killed. The brigade was given the honorary title "Ghost of Kyiv" in 2024 by a decree issued by President Zelenskyy.

On 1 October 2026, a Russian missile shot down a Ukrainian MiG-29, killing the pilot, Captain Marat Redvanovych Mambetov, over "eastern Ukraine" during a combat mission. At the time he was the flight commander of the 40th Tactical Aviation Brigade.

==== 2023 L-39 Albatros collision ====
On 25 August 2023 two L-39 Albatros jet-trainer aircraft piloted by Serhii Pokazin, Andrii Pilshchykov and Viacheslav Minka collided over the village of Sinhury, Zhytomyr Oblast. The three pilots were killed in the crash. The two aircraft had collided while performing maneuvers shortly after taking off from Ozerne Air Base, with a military investigative commission determining that the principal causes of the disaster were a "gross violation of flight safety procedures" alongside severe pilot fatigue.

== Aircraft ==
- MiG-29, MiG-29UB, MiG-29M1
- L39M1

== Former members ==
- Andrii Pilshchykov (Juice)
- Valentyn Korenchuk
- Vladyslav Savieliev
- Mykhailo Matiushenko
- Stepan Tarabalka
- Oleksii Mes

== See also ==
- Ghost of Kyiv
