= Pilot class qualification =

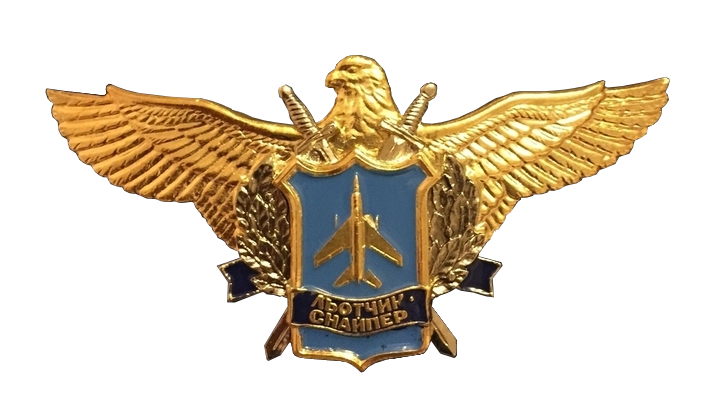
Fighter pilot's "Pilot-sniper" badge of the Ukrainian Air Force

Pilot class qualification — a professional grade level of piloting skills, commonly used for qualifying military pilots of state aviation in Ukraine and some other countries. As qualifiers used number of flight hours pilot has been reached during career in total or on some specific type of aircraft, weather conditions pilot has been able to supersede to successfully complete missions, etc.

== Pilot classes by country ==
=== Ukraine ===
Since 1993 and till 1998, Ukrainian heraldist Valeriy Lyakhov, supported by Ukrainian historian Maksym Tsarenko, designed heraldry of the Ukrainian Air Force, including badges and name tags for pilot class qualification identification.

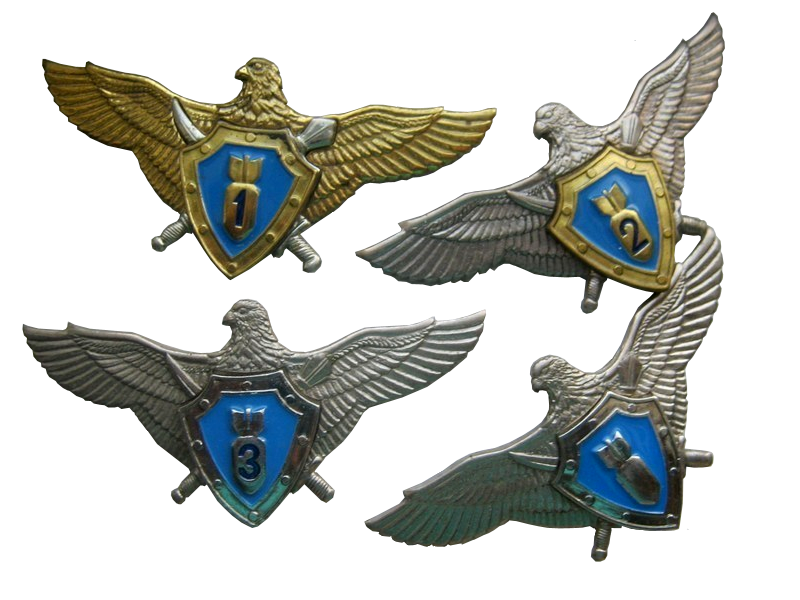
Navigator's (Bombardier's) class qualification badges of the Ukrainian Air Force

Since 2015, in Ukraine there are next qualification classes in ascending order:

- for fighter pilots and navigators (bombardiers): 3rd Class, 2nd Class, 1st Class, Sniper;
- for instructor pilots and navigators (bombardiers): 3rd Class, 2nd Class, 1st Class;
- for test pilots: 3rd Class, 2nd Class, 1st Class.

Fighter pilots' qualification classes defined as next:

- 3rd Class pilot — a pilot with more than 150 flight hours, able to complete missions at day time simple weather.
- 2nd Class pilot — a pilot with more than 200 flight hours, able to complete missions at day time extreme weather, and at night time simple weather.
- 1st Class pilot — a pilot with more than 400 flight hours, able to complete missions at day and night time all-weather.
- Pilot-sniper — a pilot with more than 550 flight hours, able to complete missions at day and night time all-weather, and having no serious or any aviation accidents in the last 12 months.
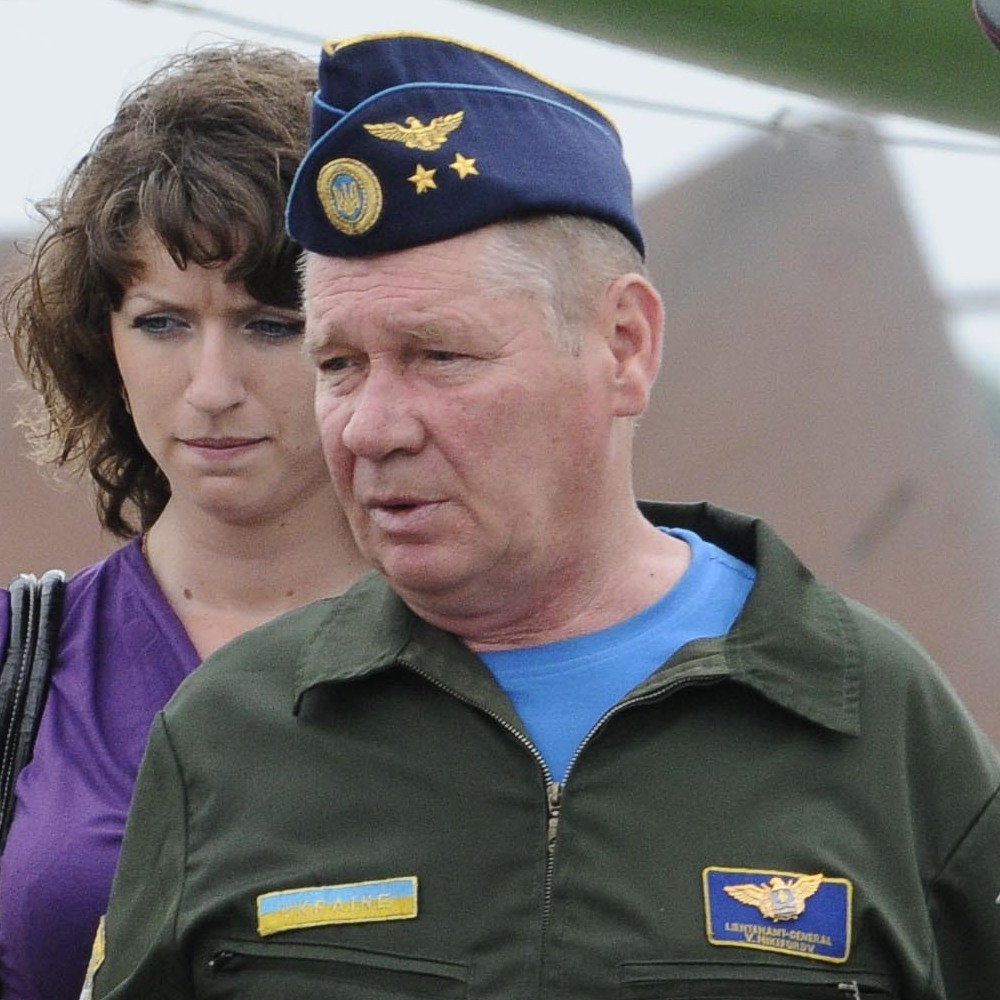
Pilot-sniper Vasyl Nikiforov

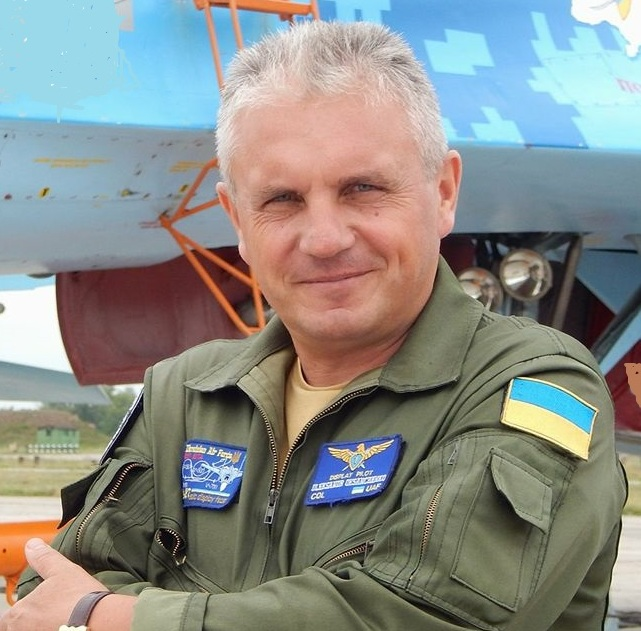
1st Class fighter pilot Oleksandr Oksanchenko

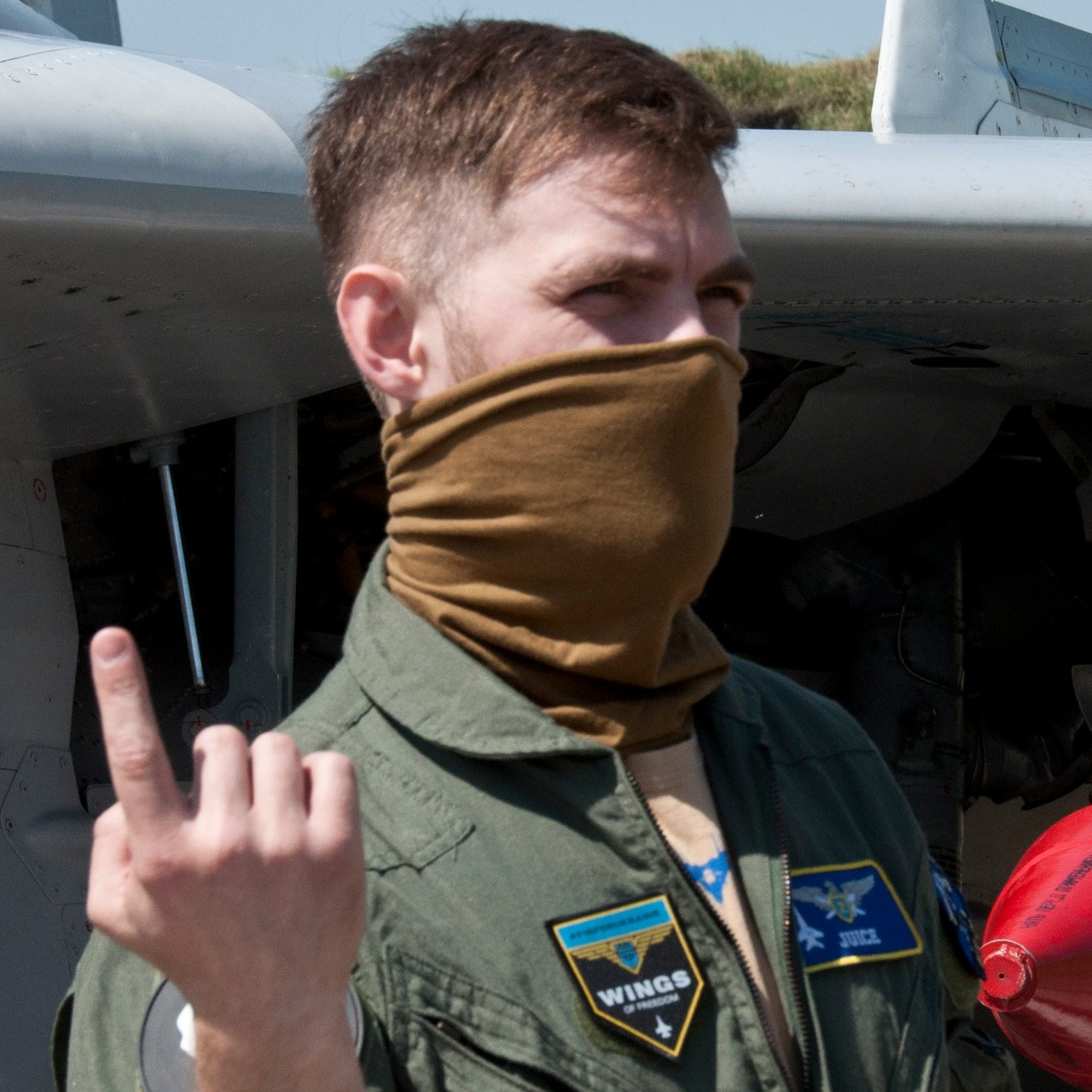
2nd Class fighter pilot Andrii "Juice" Pilshchykov

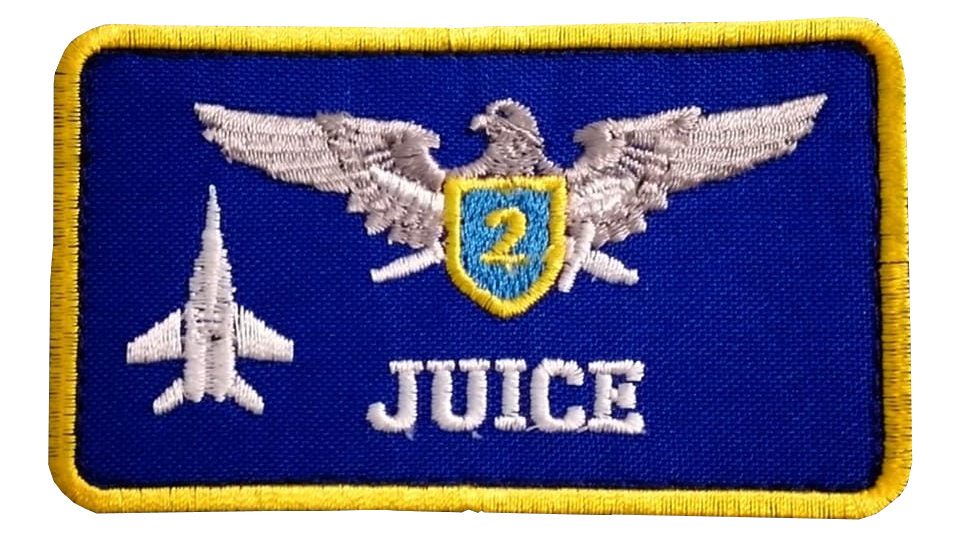
Name tag of Ukrainian 2nd Class fighter pilot "Juice"

3rd Class qualification receives pilots and navigators (bombardiers) with the rank of Lieutenant upon completion of study at the Ivan Kozhedub National Air Force University.

Pilot with less than 150 hours commonly recognized as trainee pilots. Other aviation personnel, beside pilots, have similar scheme of class qualification.

== Publications ==
- Roman Nevzorov. Pedagogical Measurement of Physical Condition as a Component of Professional Readiness of Tactical Aviation Pilots // Res Militaris, Vol. 12, No. 6 (2022). – pp.1329-1337. ISSN 2265-6294 URI: https://resmilitaris.net/menu-script/index.php/resmilitaris/article/view/2644
