= Valentyn Korenchuk =

Ukrainian fighter pilot (1976–2024)

- Валентин Коренчук
- Born: Валентин Іванович Коренчук; 31 August 1976
- Died: 27 April 2024 (aged 47)
- Burial place: Lukyanivske Military Cemetery, Kyiv, Ukraine
- Military career
- Allegiance: Ukraine
- Branch: Ukrainian Air Force
- Service years: ?–2024
- Rank: Colonel
- Nickname: Bdzholar (Бджоляр)
- Unit: 40th Tactical Aviation Brigade
- Conflicts: Russo-Ukrainian War
- Awards: Order for Courage, 3rd class

Valentyn Korenchuk (Ukrainian: Валентин Іванович Коренчук; 31 August 1976 – 27 April 2024) was a Ukrainian fighter pilot, colonel of the 40th Brigade of the Armed Forces of Ukraine, a participant of the Russian-Ukrainian war. He is a holder of the Order For Courage, 3rd class (2022).

== Biography ==
Korenchuk served as a squadron commander of the 40th Tactical Aviation Brigade.

On 24 February 2022, Korenchuk made his first flight to defend the skies over Kyiv. Subsequently, he worked on the southern and eastern directions, and also defended the center of Ukraine. He flew more than 80 combat missions, destroying a Russian attack aircraft and other enemy targets.

Korenchuk was one of the first to launch a public media campaign to provide Ukraine with modern F-16 aircraft and modernize Ukrainian combat aviation in general.

Korenchuk died on 27 April 2024.

On 18 June 2024, Valentyn Korenchuk's funeral service was held at St. Michael's Golden-Domed Monastery and Maidan Nezalezhnosti. He was buried in the Alley of Heroes at the Lukyanivske Military Cemetery.

He is survived by three children.

== Awards ==
- Order for Courage, 3rd class (2 May 2022)
