= Dmytro Fisher =

Ukrainian fighter pilot

Dmitry Fisher
- Дмитро Фішер
- Born: Dmitry Fisher Vilhelmovich; 4 August 1973
- Died: 5 June 2022 (aged 48); Kyiv Oblast, Ukraine
- Education: National Defence University of Ukraine
- Military career
- Allegiance: Ukraine
- Branch: Ukrainian Air Force
- Rank: Lieutenant colonel (Pidpolkovnyk)
- Unit: 831st Tactical Aviation Brigade
- Conflicts: Russo-Ukrainian War; 2022 Russian invasion of Ukraine
- Awards: Order of the Gold Star (posthumously)

Dmytro Vilhelmovich Fisher (Ukrainian: Дмитро Вільгельмович Фішер; 8 March 1973 – 5 June 2022) was a Ukrainian fighter pilot. He was a lieutenant colonel in the Ukrainian Air Force with a 1st Class classification, with over 1400 hours of flight time. He died during the Russian invasion of Ukraine in 2022.

== Career ==
Dmitry Fisher was born on March 8, 1973. After graduating from high school in 1990, he entered the Chernihiv Higher Military Aviation School of Pilots. In 1990, the flight school resumed training on fourth-generation combat aircraft like the MiG-29. He decided to become a Su-27 pilot, and after graduating from the flight school in 1994, he joined the Myrhorod Air Base.

In 2012, he graduated from the Kharkiv University of the Air Force of Ukraine. In 2013, he held the position of Commander, then Commander of the Aviation Squadron of the 831st Tactical Aviation Brigade of the Air Command "Center" of the Air Force of the Armed Forces of Ukraine, based in Myrhorod, Poltava Region. He flew the Su-27, MiG-29, Su-25, Su-17 and L-39 aircraft, achieving the 1st Class classification with over 1400 flight hours.

At the beginning of the Russo-Ukrainian war in 2014, Fisher intercepted a Russian Il-20 electronic reconnaissance turboprop that had violated Ukrainian airspace south of Donetsk. Keeping it within sight, he was supposed to launch a missile, but was given strict orders not to shoot it down.

In August 2017, Fisher demonstrated his aerobatic program in the Polish city of Radom at the International Airshow-2017, receiving a thank-you from the President of Poland. In the same year, he attended the British air show The Royal International Air Tattoo as part of the Ukrainian team, receiving the prize for the "Best Aerobatic Display Among Non-NATO Countries".

In 2017, he held the position of Deputy Commander of the 40th Tactical Aviation Brigade of the Air Force of the Armed Forces of Ukraine.

After Russia's full-scale invasion into Ukraine, Fischer was on the front lines, participating in the liberation of Kyiv and Snake Island regions. He died on June 5, 2022, while performing a combat mission on his Su-27 jetfighter, Blue 38, near Orekhov, Zaporizhia region. He was considered missing for more than one year.

In early February 2024, the GUR special unit's scouts evacuated Fisher's body from the crash site. In March, DNA testing confirmed the identity of the deceased pilot. On March 28, 2024, a funeral took place in Myrhorod.

== Awards ==
- Order of the Gold Star, (July 8, 2025, posthumously) - for personal courage and heroism shown in the defense of the state sovereignty and territorial integrity of Ukraine, selfless service to the Ukrainian people
- Order of Bohdan Khmelnytsky, 3rd class (April 7, 2022) — for personal courage and selfless actions shown in protecting the state sovereignty and territorial integrity of Ukraine, loyalty to the military oath.
- Medal "For Military Service to Ukraine" (December 6, 2013) - for significant personal contribution to strengthening the defense capability of the Ukrainian state, exemplary performance of military duty, high professionalism and on the occasion of the Day of the Armed Forces of Ukraine
- Medal "For Impeccable Service" III class (August 5, 2016) - for personal courage and high professionalism shown in the defense of state sovereignty and territorial integrity of Ukraine, exemplary performance of military duty and on the occasion of the Day of the Air Force of the Armed Forces of Ukraine

== See also ==
- List of aircraft losses during the Russo-Ukrainian War
