= Diego Stocco =

- Born: Rovigo, Italy
- Genres: Film score
- Occupation: Composer

Diego Stocco is an Italian sound designer and composer for movies, television and video games. He also constructs musical instruments and has used both a tree and a burning piano in his pieces.

== Movies ==
His most notable works in cinema are Takers, Sherlock Holmes, Crank and Into The Blue.

== TV ==
Diego served as music sound designer for TV shows The Tudors, Moonlight and Sleeper Cell.

== Gaming ==
He has done sound design and performed for video games such as Assassin's Creed, Far Cry Instincts and The Conduit.

== Virtual instruments ==
He also designed and programmed sound for Korg Z1, Spectrasonics Atmosphere, Omnisphere and Trillian, Bob Moog Tribute Library. He has released some of his albums on Bandcamp.
