= Ghost of Kyiv =

Mythical Ukrainian flying ace nickname

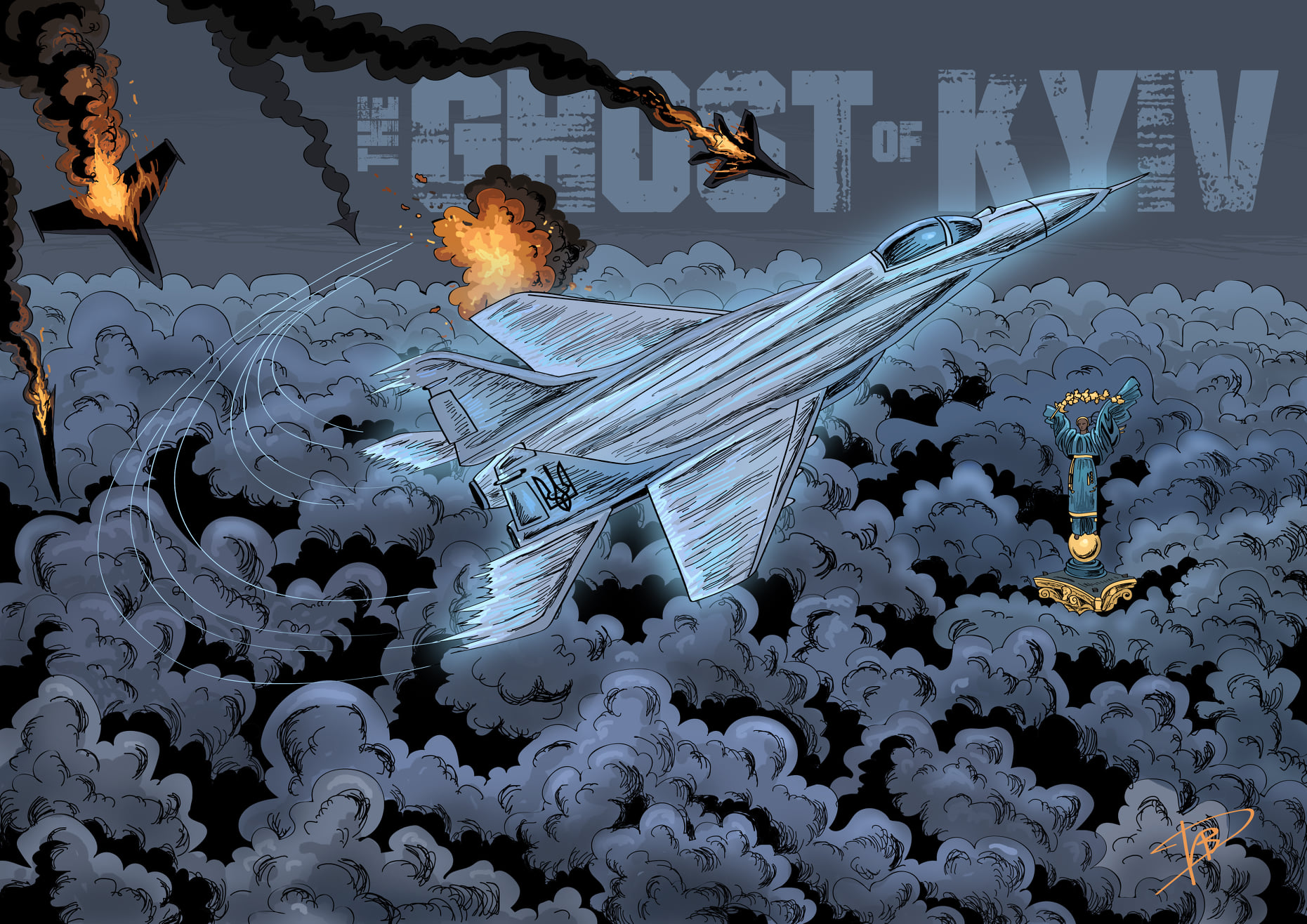
Ghost of Kyiv, painting by Ukrainian illustrator Andrii Dankovych.

The Ghost of Kyiv (Ukrainian: Привид Києва, romanized: Pryvyd Kyieva, pronounced [ˈprɪwɪd ˈkɪjewɐ]) is the nickname given to a mythical MiG-29 Fulcrum flying ace who was alleged to have shot down six Russian planes over Kyiv during the Kyiv offensive on 24 February 2022. The origin of the myth is unclear, but it was propagated widely by both Ukrainian and Western media outlets, as well as official sources such as the Armed Forces of Ukraine and the Security Service of Ukraine. The Ghost of Kyiv has been credited as a morale booster for Ukrainians during the Russo-Ukrainian War.

Two months after the story spread, the Ukrainian Air Force acknowledged that it was not factual, and warned people not to "neglect the basic rules of information hygiene" and to "check the sources of information, before spreading it". Experts have stated that stories such as Ghost of Kyiv are part of Ukrainian propaganda or a morale-boosting campaign, or potentially both.

In 2024, the 40th Tactical Aviation Brigade, the main Air Force unit active over the skies of Kyiv during the Kyiv offensive, was awarded the honorary title "Ghost of Kyiv".

== Background and claims ==
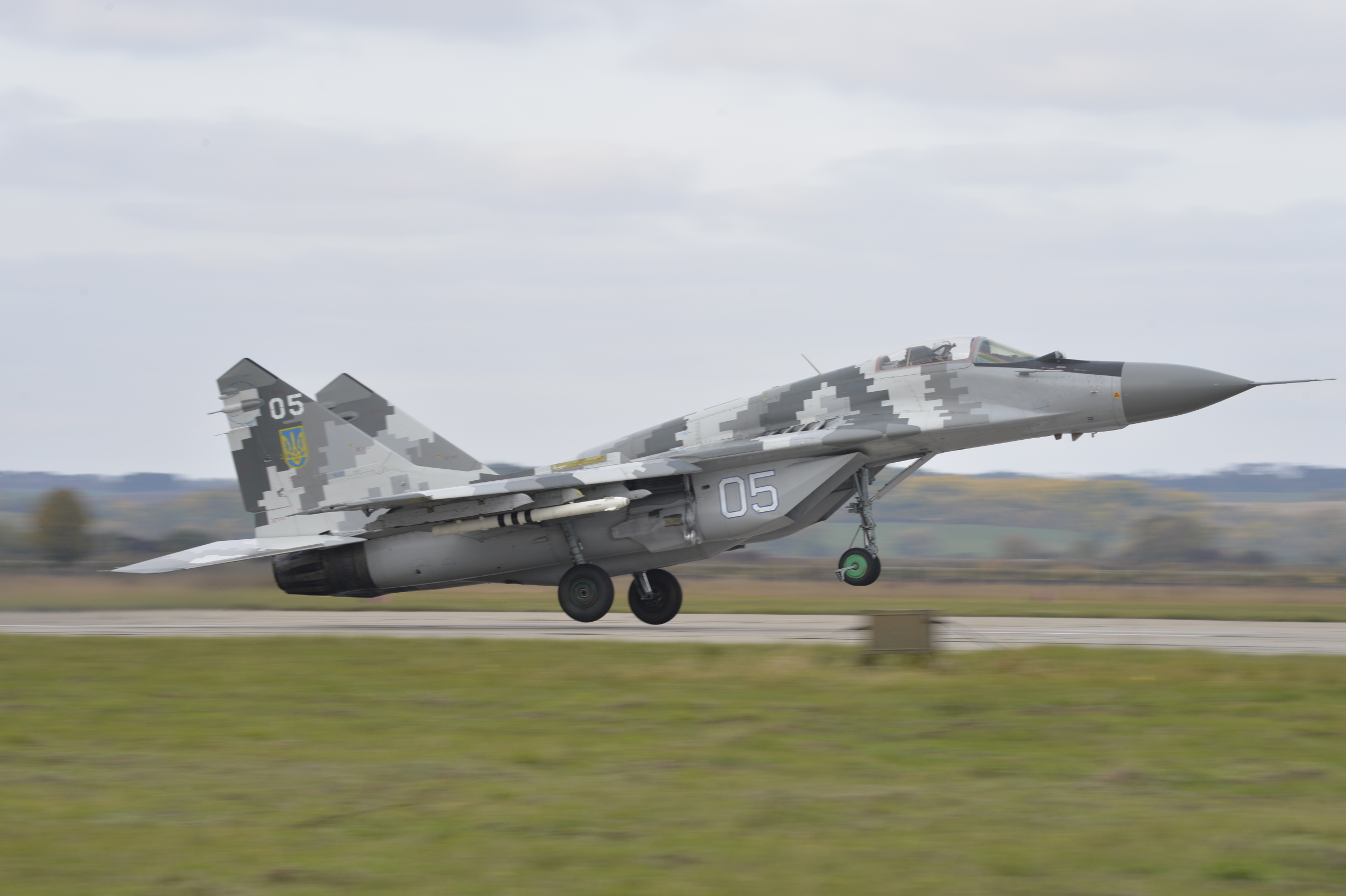
Ukrainian Air Force MiG-29 in 2018. A similar plane was credited to the Ghost of Kyiv.

=== Story ===
On 24 February 2022, Russia began a large-scale invasion of Ukraine in an escalation of a pre-existing war between the two countries. During the Kyiv offensive, which began on the first day of the invasion, videos on social media began widely circulating of fighter jets in Ukraine shortly after the invasion started, including claims of a pilot who took down multiple Russian jets. The claim that a MiG-29 pilot nicknamed the "Ghost of Kyiv" who won six air fights in the skies of Kyiv appeared during the first 30 hours of the invasion. The six planes were reported as two Su-35s, two Su-25s, an Su-27, and an enemy MiG-29. If the flying ace had existed, they would have been the first recorded fighter ace of the 21st century.

The Ukrainian Ministry of Defence claimed that—would the shoot-downs be confirmed—the Ghost of Kyiv could be one of the dozens of experienced pilots of the military reserve who returned to the Armed Forces of Ukraine after Russia invaded. In a tweet, it referred to the Ghost of Kyiv as "the air avenger". However, Ukrainian commander-in-chief Valerii Zaluzhnyi said he could only confirm a total of six Russian planes downed on the first day of fighting in Ukraine, though there may have been more.

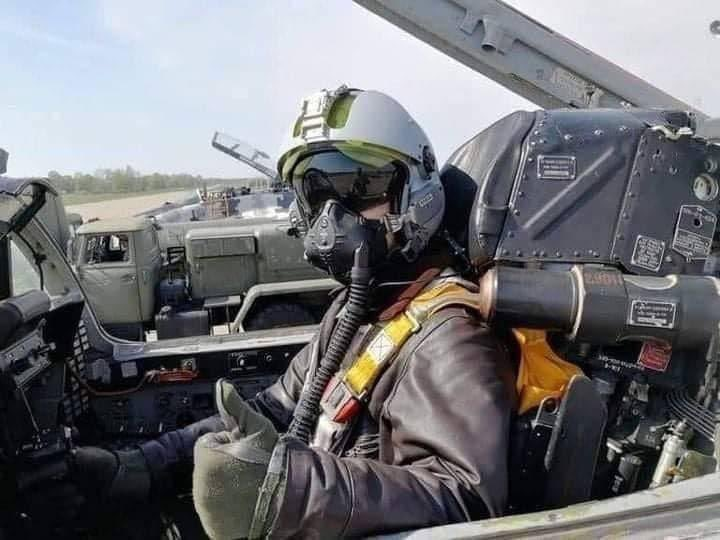
The image tweeted by Poroshenko, later revealed to be fighter pilot Andrii Pilshchykov.

Former Ukrainian president Petro Poroshenko posted a tweet of a photograph of a fighter pilot, falsely claiming it to be the Ghost of Kyiv. The photo was later found to be an unrelated image from a Ministry of Defense post from 2019. On 27 February, the Security Service of Ukraine said in a Facebook post that the Ghost of Kyiv had shot down 10 aircraft. By March 2, official sources had confirmed neither an individual identity nor an official record for the rumored pilot.

=== Doubts ===
A day later, however, The Times reported that a Ukrainian military source said the pilot was real and still alive. The Armed Forces of Ukraine posted on Facebook the purported pilot in his helmet with the visor down with the caption: "Hello, occupier, I'm coming for your soul!"

Military.com stated that the Ghost of Kyiv was "almost certainly a myth, albeit an incredibly useful one as Ukraine tries to rally its citizens to resist Russian conquest". Newsweek wrote that the Ghost of Kyiv was "very likely not real, but instead, an imaginary hero designed to bolster Ukrainians' morale in the face of the Russian invasion," adding that "there is zero evidence the 'Ghost of Kyiv' exists with Ukrainian authorities not confirming their existence".

Reexaminations have characterized the Ghost of Kyiv as a part of a larger "information war" to counter the Russian invasion. Task & Purpose and The Times of Israel have described the Ghost of Kyiv as a narrative that's an element of Ukraine's resistance.

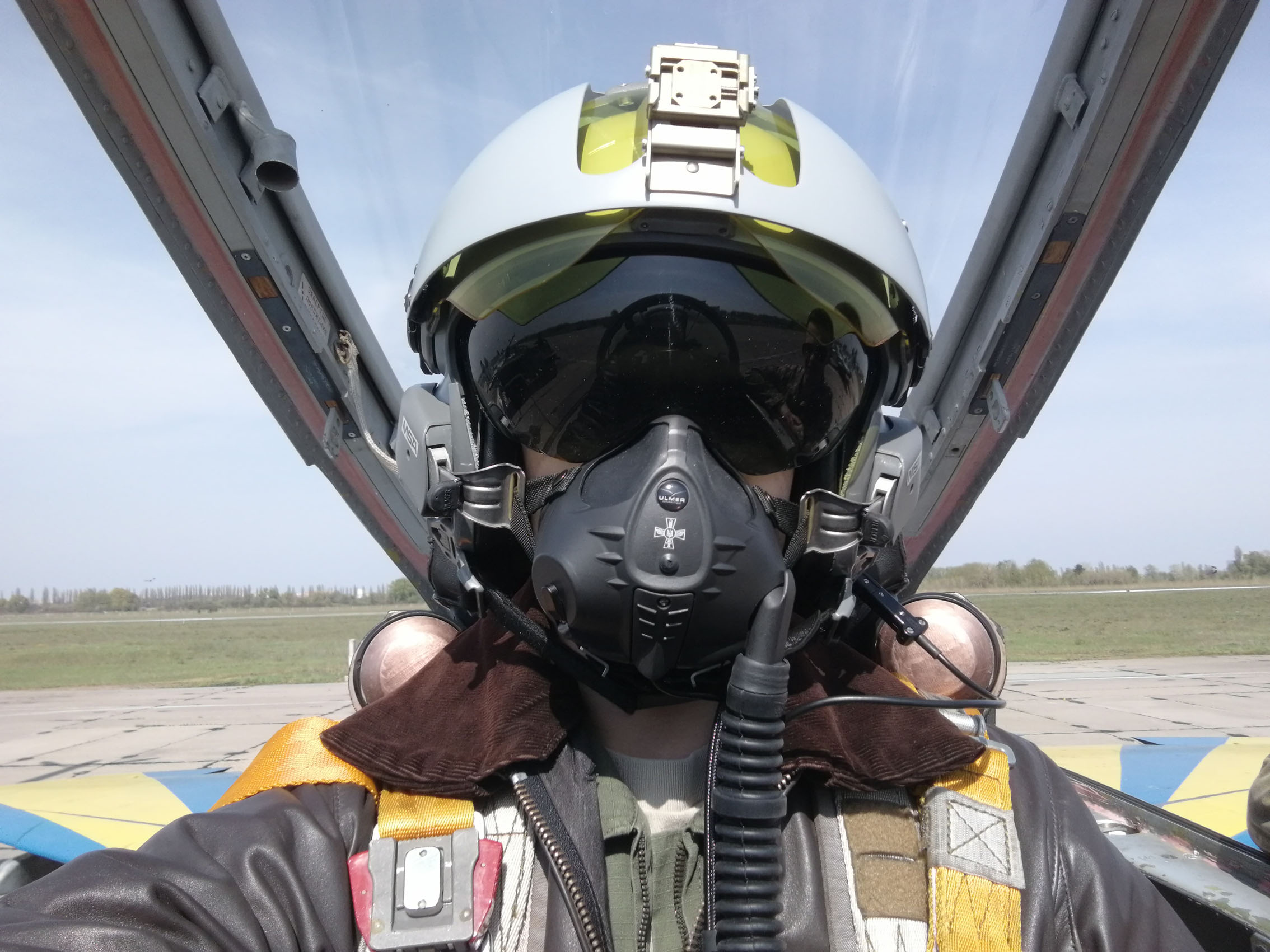
Selfie by Pilshchykov, 25 April 2019.

=== Clarifications ===
The persona is based on confirmed downing of Russian planes, assigned to one heroic figure.

On 30 April 2022, Ukraine's Air Force Command admitted the mythical status of the Ghost of Kyiv: "The ghost of Kyiv is a superhero-legend, whose character was created by Ukrainians," adding that "the #GhostOfKyiv is alive, it embodies the collective spirit of the highly qualified pilots".

In early 2024, Ukraine Ground Forces spokesperson Illia Yevlash admitted that the pilot is fictional and was created by his team after Ukrainian Force showed repeated ability to down Russian planes:

During a brainstorming session, it seems to me that Volodymyr Fityo (Ukrainian Ground Forces Spokesperson) suggested calling him "The Ghost of Kyiv." Everyone supported the idea. Later the news agencies, the United News Telemarathon, spread the info. We wrote a post about him twice, and then "The Ghost" began to live [on] his own.

Serhiy Cherevat, spokesman for the Eastern UAF Group, pointed out that the men "create[d] the image of an avenger, a national hero, a flying ace destroying the enemy aircraft."

An anonymous Ukrainian military expert told BBC that the myth helped "raise morale at a time when people need simple stories", while the Air Force Command warned people to not "neglect the basic rules of information hygiene" and to "check the sources of information, before spreading it". The statement came after multiple media outlets published stories wrongly identifying Major Stepan Tarabalka as the man behind the moniker. Tarabalka was a pilot who died on 13 March 2022 during air combat against Russian aircraft and was posthumously awarded the title Hero of Ukraine.

In an interview on June 8, addressing the Ghost of Kyiv myth specifically, Ukrainian government advisor Liubov Tsybulska indicated the importance of avoiding the use of disinformation while acknowledging that mistakes may sometimes happen. She emphasized that the Ukrainian government was "capable of having lessons learned" and further expressed the most important thing was that the misinformation was acknowledged and removed.

=== Representations ===
After Ukrainian fighter pilot Andrii Pilshchykov died on 25 August 2023, it was revealed that the original photo which purported to show the Ghost of Kyiv, shared by Poroshenko and spread by the media, showed Pilshchykov, who was also one of the original creators of the "Ghost of Kyiv" myth.

== Legacy ==
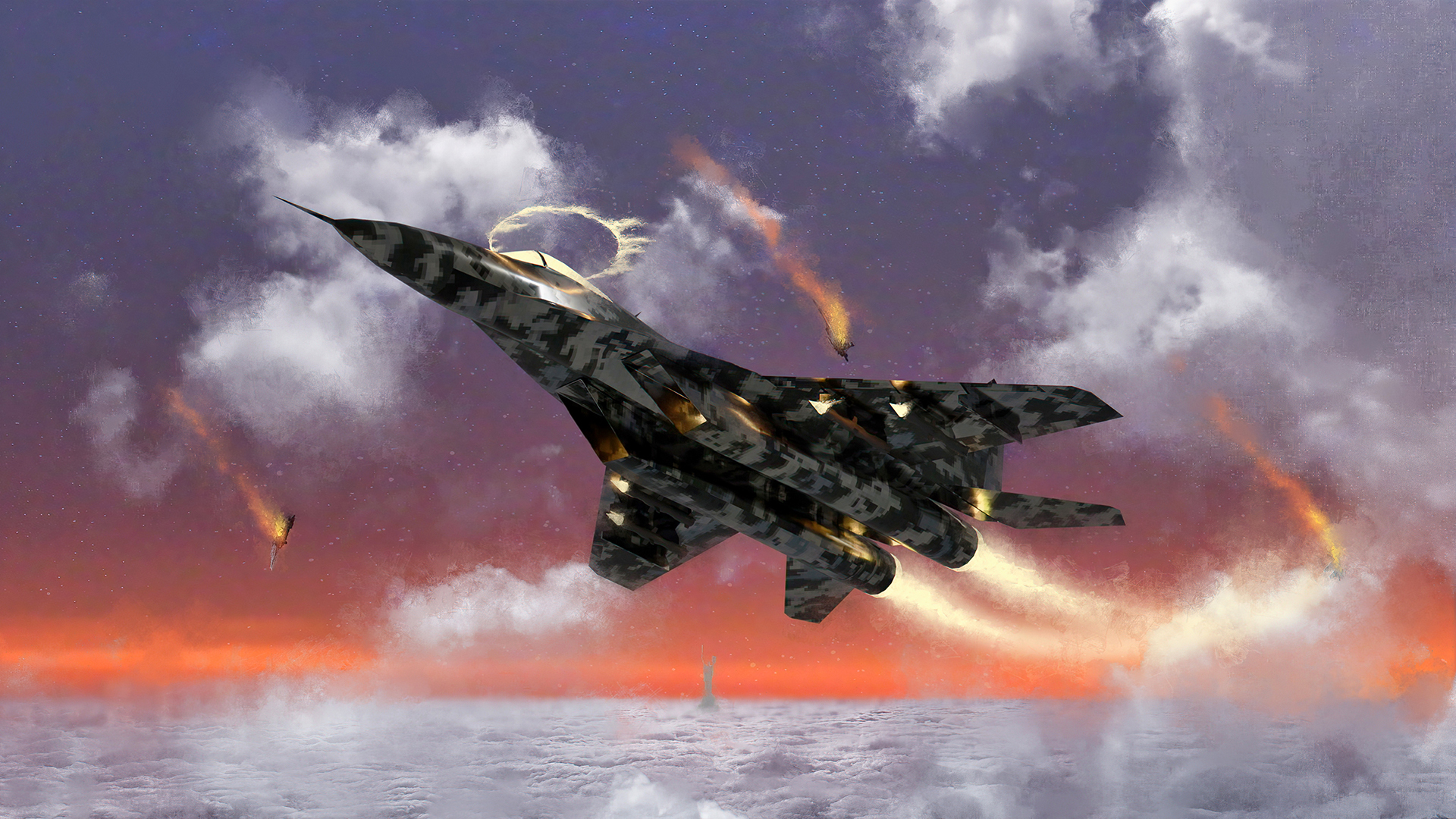
3D fan art of the Ghost of Kyiv.

Despite the Ghost of Kyiv being an urban legend or instance of war propaganda, the pilot's alleged existence has been credited as a major morale boost for the Ukrainian population by bolstering optimism during the Russian invasion. The story was widely shared by Ukrainians on social media and eventually came to be treated by some as a composite character metaphorically representing the actions of the entire Ukrainian air force.

Computer-generated footage of the Ghost of Kyiv winning a dogfight was made using the 2013 video game Digital Combat Simulator and uploaded by a YouTube user. The uploader stated in the description that the footage was not real and was merely a tribute, urging the Ghost of Kyiv, real or fake, to keep fighting. The video was subsequently shared by the official Twitter account of the Ukrainian Armed Forces. The video went viral on social media, although Snopes noted that the circulating video was miscaptioned. Similar to the Ghost of Kyiv, on 26 February 2022, social media reports emerged of a Ukrainian army soldier dubbed the "Ukrainian Reaper", who supposedly killed over twenty Russian soldiers in combat alone.

Task & Purpose argued that while it was highly unlikely there were even six air-to-air takedowns in total, given their rarity in the 21st century and Ukraine's strong missile defense, the Ghost of Kyiv was "real enough" as the spirit of the Ukrainians. Tom Demerly of The Aviationist argued that the Ghost of Kyiv is an "example of bizarre distortions ... amplified by the chaos of war".

Emblem of the 40th Tactical Aviation Brigade, referencing the Ghost of Kyiv

In 2024, the 40th Tactical Aviation Brigade, the main Air Force unit active over the skies of Kyiv during the Kyiv offensive was awarded the honorary title "Ghost of Kyiv" in 2024 by a decree issued by President Zelenskyy.

The Ghost of Kyiv has been cited as inspiration for the plot of the video game Ace Combat 8: Wings of Theve. In his review for Mezha, Oleg Danylov compared its story to the Ghost of Kyiv legend, noting that the name of the titular capital city, Theve, echoes Kyiv when rendered as "Tiv" in the review. He also compared the legendary ace's role in sustaining the morale of Usean military personnel and civilians to the way stories about the Ghost of Kyiv helped sustain Ukrainian morale during the early days of Russia's full-scale invasion of Ukraine.

== See also ==
- Disinformation in the Russian invasion of Ukraine
- Vadym Voroshylov (Karaya)
- Oleksandr Oksanchenko (Grey wolf)
- Andrii Pilshchykov (Juice)
- Stepan Tarabalka
- Mykhailo Matiushenko
- Colonel Tomb – Mythical North Vietnamese flying ace representing the Vietnam People's Air Force, and claimed killed by the Americans
- Lei Feng – Chinese soldier (1940–1962)
- White Tights – Urban legend about female snipers fighting against Russian forces
- Angels of Mons – Purported supernatural entities which protected the British Army during the Battle of Mons in 1914
- Lone gunner of Flesquières – Possibly mythical German officer in 1917
- Confirmation and overclaiming of aerial victories during World War II
- Cyborgs (Donetsk airport)
