= Lilienthal Bekas =

Bekas
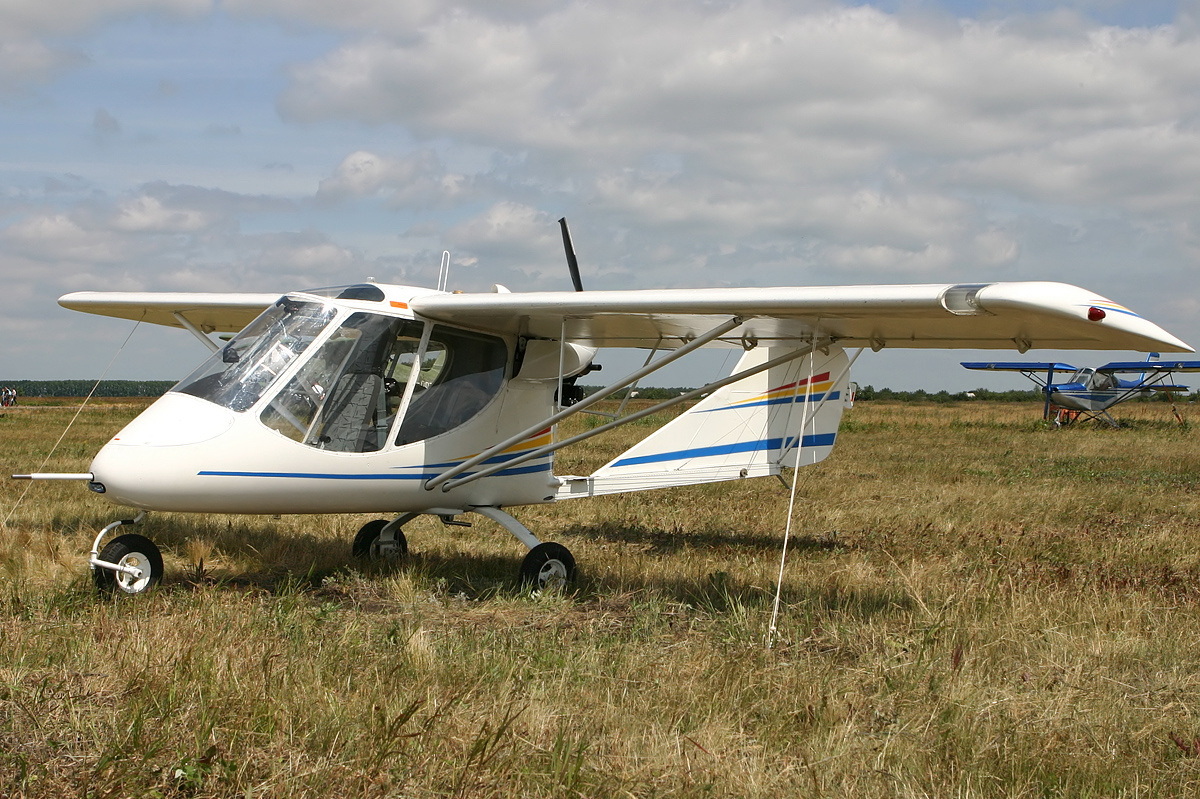

General information
- Type: Multi-purpose ultralight
- National origin: Ukraine
- Manufacturer: Lilienthal Aviation, Kharkiv
- Number built: >400 by 2009

History
- First flight: March 1993

The Lilienthal Bekas (Lilienthal Snipe in English, Лиленталь Х-32 Бекас in Russian) is a 2/3 seat, high wing single engine pusher ultralight from Ukraine. First flown in 1993, it has been produced in large numbers and in several variants.

== Design and development ==
The Lilienthal Bekas is a pod and boom, multi-purpose, pusher configuration ultralight with a high wing and low-set boom carrying a T-tail. The well glazed pod seats two in tandem and carries the constant chord wing at its top. The wing is braced to the lower fuselage by two pairs of cross braced struts and is fitted with flaps, which have a maximum deflection of 40°. A fixed, tricycle undercarriage with a castoring nosewheel is mounted on the pod.

The engine is mounted at the rear top of the pod, behind the cabin; types in the 60-100 hp (45-75 kW) range may be fitted, most commonly Rotax two or four cylinder models such as the Rotax 582 or 912UL and 912ULS. The engine is cowled on some aircraft but not all. Much of the slim boom is occupied by a broad chord fin with a straight swept leading edge. On some aircraft, it is extended forwards with a fillet. The rudder hinge, also slightly swept, is at the end of the boom. The tailplane is of constant chord and braced to the end of the boom by a strut on each side.

The aircraft has JAR-VLA certification.

== Operational history ==
The X-32 Bekas first flew in March 1993 and received its Ukrainian certification in 1995. The Rotax 582 and 912 variants were certified in 2003 and 2005 respectively. Between 2003 and 2006, the X-32 and X-34 were marketed by JAI (Jordan Aerospace Industries) as the RumBird X-32 and GulfBird X-34. in India and South Asian countries, X-32 and X-34 are being marketed and produced by their Indian partners, Engenious Aerospace Ltd. http://engeniousaerospace.com/project/aircraft-x32/ By 2009, more than 400 X-32s had been sold.

== Variants ==
Data from Jane's All the World's Aircraft 2010/11

X-32AT Bekas
Sports version, certified for limited aerobatics.
X-32UT Bekas
Dual control trainer version.
X-32CK Bekas
Agricultural version, which may be fitted with spray bars fed from tank replacing rear seat.
X-32CX Bekas
Agricultural version for crop spraying
X-32A Bekas
Ski undercarriage.
X-32H Bekas
Float undercarriage.
X-34 Bekas
Widened cabin for three, with the two passengers side-by-side on a rear bench seat; 500 mm greater span and either Rotax 912S or Rotax 914 engine.

== Specifications (X-32) ==
Data from Jane's All the World's Aircraft 2010/11

General characteristics

- Crew: one
- Capacity: one passenger
- Length: 6.55 m (21 ft 6 in)
- Wingspan: 9.00 m (29 ft 6 in)
- Height: 2.00 m (6 ft 7 in)
- Wing area: 12.33 m^{2} (132.7 sq ft)
- Airfoil: NACA 4412
- Empty weight: 300 kg (661 lb)
- Max takeoff weight: 495 kg (1,091 lb)
- Powerplant: 1 × Rotax 912 flat-four, 60 kW (80 hp)
- Propellers: 3-bladed VPSH 2 Donchak variable pitch pusher

Performance

- Cruise speed: 120 km/h (75 mph, 65 kn)
- Stall speed: 55 km/h (34 mph, 30 kn) power off, flaps down
- Never exceed speed: 158 km/h (98 mph, 85 kn)
- Endurance: 3 hrs 20 min on normal fuel load
- g limits: +3.8/-1.9
- Rate of climb: 5.0 m/s (980 ft/min)
