= Murals in Kyiv =

Murals on buildings in Kyiv, Ukraine

The Murals of Kyiv are a series of murals painted on the sides of buildings in Kyiv, Ukraine since 2014 which depict both modern and traditional art. Upwards of 160 murals are spread out across the entire city over an area of approximately 285 square kilometers. These murals are not funded by the government, but are instead funded by independent sponsors or art groups.

== Selected Artwork ==
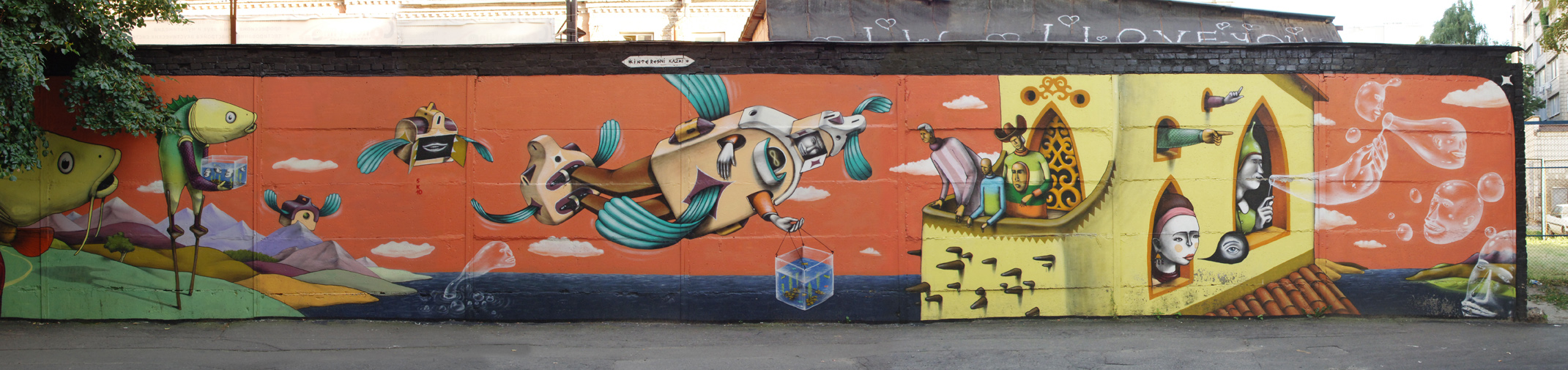
Mural by AES and Waone in Pecherskyi

=== The Rebuild ===
"The Rebuild" is a mural by Australian street artist Fintan Magee, painted in 2015. The mural depicts a lone woman with a bunch of branches in her arms, standing ankle-deep in water, seemingly after a flood. The theme of flooding recurs in many of Magee's works, and the artwork appears to represent the first steps of reconstruction and rebuilding after disaster.

=== Serhiy Nihoyan ===
"Serhiy Nihoyan" is an eponymous mural of the first person to be killed in the 2014 Hrushevskoho Street riots, an Armenian-Ukrainian activist who was shot by the Berkut while protesting. The portrait was created by Alexandre Fartu and lies in the Heavenly Hundred Garden, a formerly empty lot which was turned into a community space.

=== Revival ===
"Revival" is a joint work by French duo Seth x Kislow, which is considered to be one of the most recognizable murals in Kyiv. Created in April 2014, the mural depicts themes of Ukrainian pride and hope for the future.

=== Ukrainian St. George ===
"Ukrainian St. George" by artist AEC is an allegorical mural, referring to the story of St. George and the Dragon. The piece carries a modern political message, with the double-headed dragon representing Russia in the East and NATO in the West dividing Ukraine.

=== The Messenger of Life ===
"The Messenger of Life" is a mural by Alexandr Britcev which depicts a white crow surrounded by black crows. The mural can be found tucked away in a courtyard, and references three crows which are said to have been kept in a cage in that courtyard for twenty years.

=== Untitled Work by Xav ===
Javier Robledo, known professionally as Xav, created an untitled mural in 2017 of a smiling boy with support from Art United Us. The mural generated controversy in the local community as it depicted a black child, and racist backlash to the mural developed as it began to take shape. However, because Robledo was not beholden financially to local government or community, the mural was completed, albeit two weeks behind schedule.
