= Viacheslav Minka =

Ukrainian military aviator (1960–2023)

- Native name: В'ячеслав Мінка
- Born: Viacheslav Mykolaiovych Minka; 1960; Boryspil, Kyiv Oblast, Ukrainian SSR, USSR
- Died: 25 August 2023 (aged 62–63) near Sinhury, Zhytomyr Oblast, Ukraine
- Buried: Rohoziv Cemetery, Boryspil
- Allegiance: Ukraine
- Branch: Ukrainian Air Force
- Service years: 1985–1994, 2015–2018, 2022–2023
- Rank: Major
- Conflicts: Russo-Ukrainian War
- Awards: Hero of Ukraine
- Children: 1

Viacheslav Mykolaiovych Minka (Ukrainian: В'ячеслав Миколайович Мінка; 1960 – 25 August 2023) was a Ukrainian military pilot, Major of the 40th Tactical Aviation Brigade of the Air Force of the Armed Forces of Ukraine, a participant in the Russian-Ukrainian war. Hero of Ukraine (2023, posthumously).

== Biography ==
Minka was born in 1960 in Boryspil, Kyiv Oblast. In 1981, he graduated from the Kacha Military Aviation School. He served in Konotop, Mykolaiv, and Uman. In 1994, he retired from the Armed Forces with the rank of major and settled in Kyiv Oblast. During the ATO in Eastern Ukraine, he served in the Air Force of the Armed Forces of Ukraine since 2015. He participated in the ATO/JFO in Donbas. In 2018, he was demobilized, but with the outbreak of a full-scale war with Russia, the officer returned to the Armed Forces. He was a pilot of the 40th Tactical Aviation Brigade. Since the beginning of the full-scale Russian invasion of Ukraine on 24 February 2022, he had flown more than 200 hours before his death.

=== Death ===
Viacheslav Minka died on 25 August 2023, when his L-39 combat training aircraft collided with the plane of Major Serhii Prokazin near Sinhury in the Zhytomyr Oblast. In addition to Viacheslav Minka, two other pilots, Captain Andrii Pilshchykov (call sign Juice) and Major Serhii Prokazin, were killed. The accident was reported by CNN and widely covered by Ukrainian media. On 26 August 2023, in his address, President of Ukraine Volodymyr Zelenskyy mentioned the death of Juice in the accident. The State Bureau of Investigation opened criminal proceedings over the crash, and the circumstances of the crash are being investigated.

The funeral service for the deceased took place on 29 August 2023, at the Knyshovo Memorial Park Complex. Minka was buried at the Rohoziv Cemetery in Boryspil.

== Family ==
Minka is survived by his wife, child and other relatives.
