= Serhii Prokazin =

Ukrainian military aviator (died 2023)

- Native name: Сергій Проказін
- Born: 3 November 1975 Termez, Surxondaryo Region, Uzbek SSR, Soviet Union (now Uzbekistan)
- Died: 25 August 2023 (aged 47) near Sinhury, Zhytomyr Oblast, Ukraine
- Allegiance: Ukraine
- Branch: Ukrainian Air Force
- Rank: Major
- Conflicts: Russo-Ukrainian War
- Awards: Hero of Ukraine

Serhii Prokazin (Ukrainian: Сергій Леонідович Проказін; 3 November 1975 – 25 August 2023) was a Ukrainian military pilot, Major of the 40th Tactical Aviation Brigade of the Air Force of the Armed Forces of Ukraine, a participant in the defence of Ukraine during the Russian-Ukrainian war and the full-scale Russian invasion afterwards. He was posthumously awarded the Hero of Ukraine in 2023.

== Biography ==
A resident of Poltava Oblast, Prokazin was involved with aviation for 24 years. He served as a major, pilot and deputy commander of the 40th Tactical Aviation Brigade.

From the beginning of the Russian invasion of Ukraine in 2022, he logged more than 100 hours of combat flight time, and was involved in air operations, including tactical missions in the Eastern and Zaporizhzhia directions.

Prokazin died on 25 August 2023 in a collision between two L-39 combat trainer aircraft. He was piloting one aircraft, while the other was piloted by Major Viacheslav Minka. The accident happened near Sinhury, Zhytomyr Oblast.
