= Oleksii Mes =

Ukrainian fighter pilot (1993–2024)

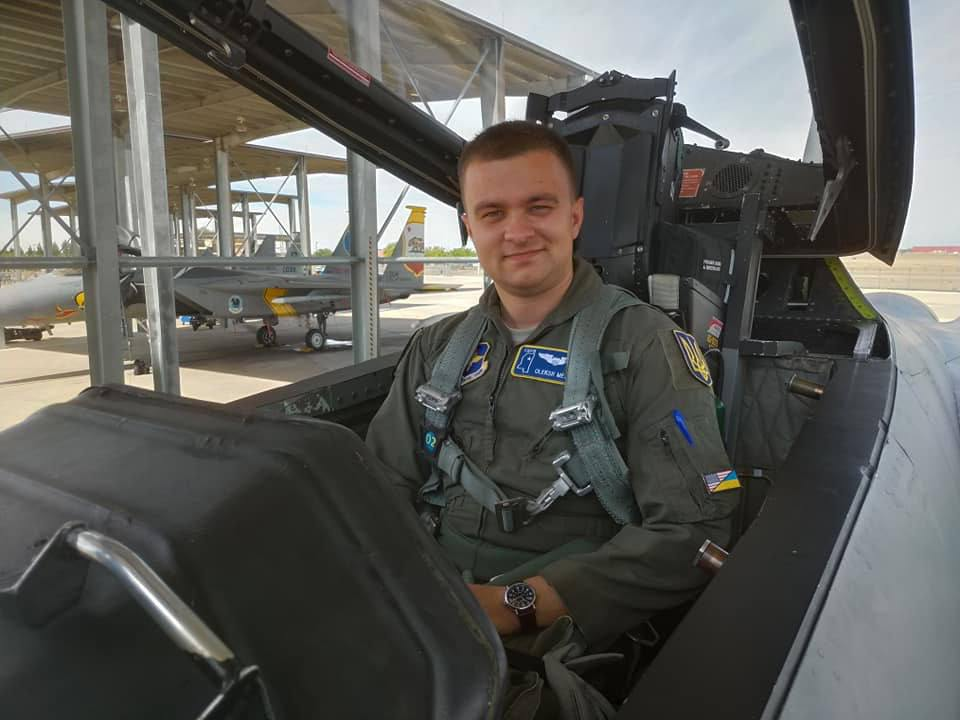
- Native name: Олексій Месь
- Nickname: Moonfish (Мунфіш)
- Born: 20 October 1993 Shepetivka, Khmelnytskyi Oblast, Ukraine
- Died: 26 August 2024 (aged 30)
- Allegiance: Ukraine
- Branch: Ukrainian Air Force
- Conflicts: Russo-Ukrainian War: 26 August 2024 Russian strikes on Ukraine †
- Awards: Order of the Gold Star; Medal For Military Service to Ukraine

Oleksii Serhiiovych Mes (Ukrainian: Олексій Сергійович Месь; 20 October 1993 – 26 August 2024) was a Ukrainian fighter pilot with the call sign "Moonfish" of the Air Force of the Armed Forces of Ukraine. He died when his F-16 crashed while repelling a Russian missile attack, according to the Ukrainian military. In 2025, he was posthumously awarded the title of Hero of Ukraine.

== Biography ==
Oeksii Mes was born in Shepetivka on 20 October 1993.

As of June 2022, Moonfish was the commander of a squadron of Ukrainian MiG-29 fighters.

In August 2023, Moonfish started a training course in the United Kingdom with plans to eventually fly an F-16.

== Advocacy efforts ==
In June 2022, Moonfish visited the US with another Ukrainian pilot, call sign Juice, to lobby for F-16s for Ukraine. They met with several US lawmakers and explained which modern weapons systems were needed most in Ukraine. Sean Penn accompanied the pilots in some of the meetings, to amplify their message. The pilots met with Adam Kinzinger in his office in Washington, D.C. As a result, Kinzinger introduced the Ukraine Fighter Pilots Act to the United States House of Representatives on 17 June 2022. The bill was cosponsored by other congressmembers.

== F-16 involvement ==
After months of advocacy to ensure F-16s for Ukraine, Moonfish was among the first Ukrainian pilots to start F-16 training in the US. He gave an extensive interview to Ukrainian TV describing the process. In the fall of 2023, his training advanced from a simulator cockpit to actual F-16 airframes.

== Death ==
On 26 August 2024, Moonfish was killed when his F-16 crashed while repelling a Russian aerial attack, according to the Ukrainian military. He was 30.

A special commission from the Ministry of Defense has been established to determine the cause of the accident and is currently working in the area where the plane went down.

Ukrainian lawmaker Maryana Bezuhla has claimed, "According to my information, the F-16 of Ukrainian pilot Oleksiy 'Moonfish' Mes was shot down by a Patriot anti-aircraft missile system due to discoordination between units".

== Awards ==
- Titled Hero of Ukraine with the Order of the Golden Star (14 March 2025, posthumously)
- Medal For Military Service to Ukraine (6 September 2022)

== See also ==
- Vadym Voroshylov (Karaya)
- Andrii Pilshchykov (Juice)
