= Stepan Tarabalka =

Ukrainian fighter pilot (1993–2022)

- Born: Stepan Ivanovych Tarabalka; 9 January 1993; Korolivka, Kolomyia Raion, Ukraine
- Died: March 13, 2022 (aged 29)
- Allegiance: Ukraine
- Branch: Ukrainian Air Force
- Service years: 2014–2022
- Rank: Major
- Conflicts: Russo-Ukrainian War; Annexation of Crimea; War in Donbas; Russian invasion of Ukraine; Kyiv offensive
- Awards: Order of the Gold Star
- Spouse: Olenia

Stepan Ivanovych Tarabalka (Ukrainian: Степан Іванович Тарабалка; 9 January 1993 – 13 March 2022), in English media also referred to as Stephen Tarabalka, was a Ukrainian military officer, a pilot and a major in the Ukrainian Air Force. He served during the Russo-Ukrainian War, including the 2022 Russian invasion of Ukraine.

== Early life and education ==
Tarabalka was born on 9 January 1993 in Korolivka, Kolomyia Raion, Ukraine, where he grew up as part of a poor family. His family regularly worked in Portugal, where they could earn a better living, but returned to Ukraine frequently. He lived near a military base, and constantly saw military aircraft landing nearby, which inspired him from an early age to become a pilot. Tarabalka supported himself through military school and then flight school, studying at the Ivan Kozhedub National Air Force University and graduating in 2014.

== Career ==
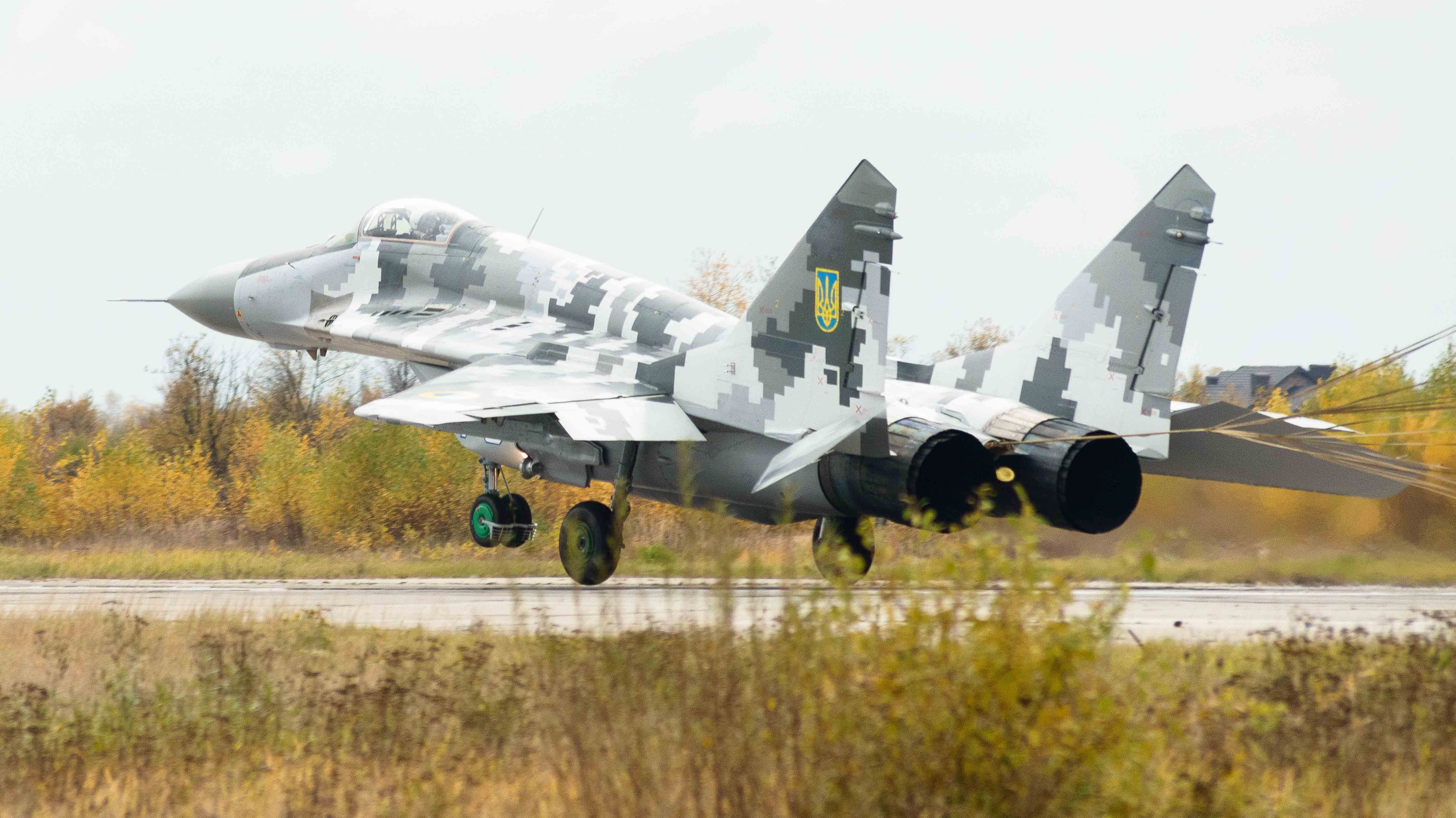
Tarabalka piloted a Ukrainian MiG-29, as depicted

The initial conflict in 2014, involving Russian annexation of Crimea and conflict in the east of Ukraine with two secessionist states, was Tarabalka's first experience in combat. This saw him gain experience flying support missions over the Donbas region.

Tarabalka was shot down on 13 March 2022 in the sky over Zhytomyr Oblast, Ukraine, while he was piloting a MiG-29 during a dogfight against several Russian fighter jets. International media speculated whether the legendary pilot, who was dubbed the "Ghost of Kyiv", and Tarabalka were in fact the same person, or whether the Ghost legend was simply made up and then applied to Tarabalka after his death, when his success against the Russian Air Force was known. However, an interview was published in April 2022 with a pilot discussing the Ghost (who was a member of his unit) before his identity was released. In the interview, the pilot indicated details that match Tarabalka as the Ghost, including the fact he flew a MiG-29 and was 29 years old.

According to the Air Force Command of the Ukrainian Armed Forces, Tarabalka was not the "Ghost of Kyiv". The total amount of 40 aircraft shot down was done together by the pilots of the 40th Tactical Aviation Brigade. Other sources, including the New York Post and The Times of London, indicated that Tarabalka himself had shot down the 40 aircraft.

== Death ==
Tarabalka was killed in action on 13 March 2022, at the age of 29, with rumours at the time raising suspicion he was the mysterious Ghost figure. According to Ukrainian sources, he died while on a mission, outnumbered in a dogfight. Tarabalka was buried in a cemetery in Korolivka, near Kolomyia. The Ukrainian Government planned to auction his helmet and gloves to raise funds for the ongoing conflict. It posthumously awarded him Ukraine's top award for bravery, the Order of the Golden Star, with the title Hero of Ukraine.

== Personal life ==
Tarabalka was married and had an 8-year-old son at the time of his death. His mother, Nataliia Tarabalka, is a founder of the "Warmth of the Winged Soul" health center in the village of Tseniava.
