= List of aviation shootdowns and accidents during the Russo-Ukrainian war =

This is a list of Ukrainian, Russian and Russian-separatist aircraft losses during the Russo-Ukrainian War based on visual evidence or official confirmation from involved parties. It includes proven helicopter, fixed-wing aircraft and combat drone (UCAVs) losses from the War in Donbas, the current Russian invasion of Ukraine and the Wagner Group mutiny.

== Donbas (2014–2022) ==
During the War in Donbas, on 20 November 2014, Ukrainian sources reported at a press conference in London, United Kingdom, that their total aerial losses during the conflict in the east were: one Su-24, six Su-25s, two MiG-29s, one An-26, one An-30 and one Il-76. Another Su-24 was damaged. Helicopter losses amounted to seven Mi-8/17s and five Mi-24s.

=== Ukraine ===
Fixed-wing aircraft
Operator	Date	Comments
(Ukraine)	6 June 2014	An An-30B surveillance plane, bort number Yellow 80, was shot down with two shoulder-launched missiles fired from Pro-Russian rebels during the siege of Sloviansk. Five crewmen were killed and three survived.
(Ukraine)	14 June 2014	An Ilyushin Il-76 transport plane was shot down as it approached an airport in Luhansk, killing nine crew members and 40 troops on board.
(Ukraine)	2 July 2014	A Ukrainian Sukhoi Su-25, call sign Blue 06, crashed due to a technical fault while landing at Dnipropetrovsk International Airport. The pilot ejected safely.
(Ukraine)	2 July 2014	A Ukrainian Sukhoi Su-24, call sign Yellow 11, was damaged by MANPAD fire, the engine caught fire but managed to land but caught fire again and the fire was extinguished. The crew was alive and well.
(Ukraine)	14 July 2014	An Antonov An-26 transport aircraft was shot down by a surface-to-air missile over eastern Ukraine while flying at 6,500 metres (21,300 ft). The Ukrainian defence minister claimed that the altitude is far from the reach of a shoulder-launched missile, suggesting that the aircraft was downed. Two crewmembers were captured by pro-Russian militia, four were rescued by Ukrainian forces. The remaining two aviators were found dead on 17 July.
(Ukraine) (2)	16 July 2014	An Su-25, call sign Blue 03, was shot down over eastern Ukraine near Amvrosiivka, and the pilot ejected successfully. National Security Council spokesman Andriy Lysenko said that it was shot down by a missile fired from a Russian MiG-29. Another Su-25 call sign Blue 41 was damaged by separatist a MANPAD, the attack fighter landed safety.
(Ukraine) (2)	23 July 2014	Two Su-25s, call signs Blue 04 and Blue 33, were shot down in the rebel-held area of Savur-Mohyla. Ukrainian authorities claimed that they were hit by anti-aircraft missiles launched from Russia. Ukrainian Prime Minister Arseniy Yatsenyuk said that one of the attack planes was probably shot down by an air-to-air missile.
(Ukraine)	7 August 2014	Pro-Russian forces shot down a MiG-29 with a 9K37 Buk missile near Yenakiieve. The pilot safely ejected. Separatist sources claimed he was captured and interrogated.
(Ukraine)	17 August 2014	A MiG-29 was shot down by rebels in Luhansk Oblast returning after a successful mission. The pilot ejected and was found by search and rescue.
(Ukraine)	20 August 2014	An Su-24M, White 27, was shot down by rebel forces in Luhansk Oblast. The two crew members ejected successfully.
(Ukraine)	29 August 2014	A Sukhoi Su-25, call sign Blue 08, was shot down near Starobesheve by a surface-to-air missile during the battle of Ilovaisk. The pilot, Captain Vladyslav Voloshyn, ejected and after 4 days reached Ukrainian-controlled territory.

Rotary-wing aircraft
Operator	Date	Comments
(Ukraine)	25 April 2014	A Mil Mi-8MT, call sign Yellow 55, was destroyed after it was struck by small arms fire on the fuel tanks while preparing for departure in Kramatorsk Airport.
(Ukraine) (2)	2 May 2014	Two Mil Mi-24s were shot down during large-scale operations during the Siege of Sloviansk. Rebels claimed they had taken one pilot captive. The Ukrainian Ministry of Internal Affairs reported that two helicopters had been shot down, killing two airmen.
(Ukraine)	5 May 2014	A Mil Mi-24 crashed after it was shot down by a heavy machine gun operated by rebel forces. The damaged helicopter landed in a river, and all crew members survived. Later, it was destroyed by an airstrike.
(Ukraine)	29 May 2014	A Mil Mi-8 was shot down by rebel forces between Kramatorsk and Mount Karachun, killing 14 on board, among them General Serhiy Kulchytsky. Another soldier was seriously injured.
(Ukraine)	4 June 2014	Two Mil Mi-24s were forced to land by rebel fire; one was burned out by the damage and could not be repaired.
(Ukraine)	21 June 2014	A Mil Mi-8 crashed while delivering military hardware near Chuhuiv.
(Ukraine)	24 June 2014	The Ukrainian military said that an Mil Mi-8 had been shot down by pro-Russian rebels in the east near Sloviansk, killing all nine people on board.
(Ukraine)	7 August 2014	Pro-Russian forces shot down an Mi-8MT, call sign Yellow 62, in Manuilivka, Donetsk Oblast.
(Ukraine)	19 August 2014	A Mil Mi-8 was shot down near the village of Heorhiivka, Luhansk Oblast.
(Ukraine)	20 August 2014	A Mil Mi-24 was shot down near the town of Horlivka according to the Ukrainian Ministry of Defence. Both pilots died in the attack.
(Ukraine)	27 August 2014	A Mil Mi-8, call sign Yellow 59, crashed while landing in Olenivka, Donetsk Oblast.

=== Russia ===
(Russia) Russian Army	August 2014	A Forpost drone was shot down in eastern Ukraine.
(Russia) Russian Army	October 2014	A Forpost drone was lost in eastern Ukraine.
(Russia) Russian Army	May 2015	A Forpost drone was shot down by the Ukrainian Dnipro-1 Battalion in Pisky, Donetsk Oblast, Ukraine.
(Russia) Russian Army	October 2016	A Forpost drone was lost in eastern Ukraine.
(Russia) Russian Army	October 2016	A Forpost drone was lost in eastern Ukraine.

=== Total losses ===
Aircraft losses
Airframe	Destroyed	Damaged
MiG-29	2 (Ukraine)	
Su-25	5 (Ukraine)	1 (Ukraine)
Su-24	1 (Ukraine)	1 (Ukraine)
An-26	1 (Ukraine)	
An-30	1 (Ukraine)	
Il-76	1 (Ukraine)	
Mi-8/17	7 (Ukraine)	
Mil Mi-24	5 (Ukraine)	
Forpost	5 (Russia)	

== Russian invasion of Ukraine (2022–present) ==
=== Ukraine ===
==== Fixed-wing aircraft ====
===== 2022 =====
Service	Date	Type	Description
(Ukraine)	24 February	Unknown	Ukrainian officials reported that a military aircraft of unspecified type was destroyed by Russian missiles in Odesa Air Base.
(Ukraine)	24 February	L-39M1 Albatros	An L-39M1 Albatros Blue 106 light attack jet from the 39th Tactical Aviation Brigade was shot down by Russian aircraft in Khmelnytskyi Oblast. Pilot Dmytro Kolomiyets was killed.
(Ukraine) (5)	24 February	5 MiG-29	Five MiG-29s from 40th Tactical Aviation Brigade were shot down in air combat by Russian aircraft: MiG-29MU1, White 05, piloted by Lt. Colonel Yerko Viacheslav Volodymyrovych was shot down in Volodymyrivka, the pilot died. Another was shot down over Dnipro river near Kosyn in Kyiv Oblast. The pilot ejected. One MiG-29 was shot down in Sosnivka, Vyshhorod Raion, Kyiv Oblast, the pilot ejected. One MiG-29UB with Volodomyr Kokhanskyi and Roman Pasulko was shot down over Sukholisy, Bila Tserkva Raion. Finally MiG-29MU1, Blue 03, piloted by Viacheslav Radionov was shot down near Mala Soltanivka, Kyiv Oblast.
(Ukraine) (4)	24 February	2 Su-25; 2 L-39 Albatros	Russian missile strikes against Kulbakino Air Base destroyed two stored Su-25 attack aircraft; Blue 12, Blue 42 and two L-39 trainers.
(Ukraine) (7)	24 February	6 L-39 Albatros; 1 MiG-29	Russian missile strikes against Chuhuiv Air Base destroyed six L-39 trainers in non-operational storage. An operational MiG-29 was damaged beyond repair after crashing during take-off.
(Ukraine) (5)	24 February	4 MiG-29; 1 Su-24	Russian missile strikes against Starokostiantyniv Air Base destroyed at least four MiG-29s and at least one Su-24 in non-operational storage.
(Ukraine)	24 February	An-26	An An-26 transport aircraft, call sign Blue 59, was shot down south of Kyiv; five from a crew of fourteen were killed.
(Ukraine) (2)	24 February	2 Su-27	Russian strikes left a Su-27, codename Blue 37 destroyed and caused damage to another Su-27 on Ozerne Air Base in Zhytomyr Oblast. Seven pilots and servicemen, including Lt. Colonel Eduard Vahorovskyi were killed.
(Ukraine)	24 February	Mig-29	Russian strikes damaged a Mig-29 parked in the ground in Vasylkiv Air Base. The aircraft was later repaired.
(Ukraine)	27 February	MiG-29	Russian strikes on Lutsk Air Base, destroyed a MiG-29, call sign Blue 28 that was stored in a hangar.
(Ukraine)	24 February	Su-24M	An Su-24M, call sign White 20 was shot down by Russian forces in Hostomel; both pilots, Major Dmitry Kulikov and Major Nikolai Savchuk were killed.
(Ukraine)	24 February	Il-76MD	An Il-76MD, registration UR-76697 of the 25th Transport Aviation Brigade was destroyed by a Russian strike at Melitopol Air Base.
(Ukraine) (5)	24–26 February	5 Su-25	Five Su-25s from the 299th Tactical Aviation Brigade were lost in Kherson Oblast: On 24 February, Su-25M1, call sign Blue 19, was shot down near Chaplynka, pilot Lt. Col Oleksandr Zhybrov ejected but died. Su-25M1 call sign Blue 30, was shot down in the same event, the pilot Oleksander Scherbakov was killed. The same day a Su-25, call sign Blue 17 flown by Mayor Rostislav Lazarenko was damaged on Chorna Dolyna, Lazarenko managed to land the aircraft on Melitopol but the airframe was damaged beyond repair and was further damaged by strafing Russian aircraft. On 26 February, Su-25M1K, call sign Blue 31, from the 299th TAB was shot down by a Russian AD near Fedorivka. Captain Andriy Antikhovich died. Finally Su-25, call sign Blue 49 was shot down by Russian forces using a 9K333 Verba MANPAD in Molodizhne, Kherson Oblast, pilot Andriy Maksymov ejected and was captured on 26–27 February.
(Ukraine)	25 February	MiG-29	A MiG-29, Blue 35, was lost between Horolivka and Hrushka in Ivano-Frankivsk.
(Ukraine)	25 February	Su-27P	A Su-27P, call sign Blue 100 was shot down over Kyiv by Russian S-400 SAMs; the crash damaged a residential complex. The pilot, Colonel Oleksandr Oksanchenko was killed.
(Ukraine)	25 February	Su-25M1K	An Su-25M1K, call sign Blue 39, piloted by Hennadii Matuliak, was shot down by a Russian jet-fighter near Hlibivka, Vyshhorod, Kyiv Oblast.
(Ukraine)	25 February	Su-24M	Su-24M, call sign White 08, was shot down in Voznesenske, Zolotonosha Raion, Cherkasy Oblast.
(Ukraine) (6)	26 February	6 MiG-29	A Russian missile attack on Ivano-Frankivsk International Airport destroyed six MiG-29s and killed one Ukrainian servicemen.
(Ukraine)	26 February	Su-25	A Su-25, in grey camouflage painting was destroyed in the ground at Kulbakino Air Base, Mykolaiv Oblast.
(Ukraine) (4)	27 February	4 Su-24	Military aircraft were destroyed by Russian attacks on Lutsk Air Base, Commercial satellite imagery showed the wreckage of four stored Su-24s.
(Ukraine)	27 February	Su-24M	An Su-24M, call sign White 77, from the 7th Tactical Aviation Brigade was shot down near Bucha, Kyiv Oblast. The pilots, Commander Ruslan Bilous and Commander Roman Dovhaliuk were killed and awarded the Order of Bohdan Khmelnytsky.
(Ukraine)	27 February	An-26	An An-26 in storage at Kherson International Airport was destroyed following the Russian capture of the airport.
(Ukraine)	28 February	Su-27S	An Su-27S, call sign Blue 11 was shot down by MANPADS over Kropyvnytskyi, Kirovohrad Oblast. Its pilot, Maj. Stepan Chobanu, was killed. He was awarded Hero of Ukraine on 3 March.
(Ukraine)	1 March	Su-24M	An Su-24M, from the 7th Tactical Aviation Brigade was shot down near the village of Krasenyvka, Zolotonosha, Cherkasy Oblast. The pilots were wounded, but survived.
(Ukraine)	2 March	Su-25M1	An Su-25M1, Blue 29 from 299th Tactical Aviation Brigade piloted by Oleksandr Korpan was lost over Starokostiantyniv, Khmelnytskyi Oblast. Korpan died as a result.
(Ukraine)	2 March	MiG-29	A MiG-29 piloted by Oleksandr Brynzhala was shot down by Russian aircraft over Kyiv. On 2 April, Brynzhala was awarded Hero of Ukraine order, posthumously.
(Ukraine)	2 March	Su-24M	An Su-24M, White 66, was shot down near Novohrad-Volynskyi; the pilot, Colonel Mykola Kovalenko, and navigator, Captain Yevhen Kazimirov, died.
(Ukraine)	3 March	Su-25M1	An Su-25M1, call sign Blue 40, from the 299th Tactical Aviation Brigade piloted by Captain Vadym Moroz was lost over Mykolaiv.
(Ukraine) (2)	4 March	Su-25/UB; L-39 Albatros	An Su-25 or UB variant, was destroyed in the ground by Russian forces in Kulbakino Air Base, Mykolaiv Oblast. Also a L-39M1 Albatros trainer was destroyed as well.
(Ukraine)	5 March	Unknown	An unidentified Ukrainian jetfighter was shot down by Russian aircraft over Zhytomyr Oblast. The pilot ejected and survived.
(Ukraine) (3)	6 March	3 Su-27	A Russian attack on Kanatove Reserve Air Base left three Su-27s, Blue 26, 46 and 48, damaged.
(Ukraine)	6 March	An-26	An An-26 cargo plane, call sign Blue 57, was destroyed at Vinnytsia Air Base after a Russian missile attack.
(Ukraine)	6 March	Su-25	An Su-25 was lost in Snihurivka, Mykolaiv Oblast according to the Ukrainian Mayor of Mykolaiv and Russian sources that reported the shotdown of a Ukrainian Su-25 by a Russian Su-35.
(Ukraine) (2)	8 March	2 MiG-29	Two MiG-29 were shot down by Russian forces in Zhytomyr highway. From one of the shotdown fighters the pilot ejected and survived, but from the other the pilot Major Andriy Liutashyn was killed.
(Ukraine)	9 March	MiG-29	A MiG-29, White 10, piloted by Commander Yevhen Lysenko; his fighter was destroyed by Russian air defenses while fighting Russian aircraft near Zhytomyr.
(Ukraine)	9 March	Su-24M	An Su-24M, call sign White 26, was shot down by a Russian missiles near Lebedyn, Sumy Oblast, the pilots bailed out and survived.
(Ukraine)	10 March	Su-27	At least one Su-27 was damaged or destroyed during a Russian missile strike on Kanatove Air Base confirmed by satellite imagery.
(Ukraine)	12 March	Su-24M	An Su-24M was shot down by Russian forces near Bilyaivka village, Beryslav Raion, Kherson Oblast. The pilots, Valeriy Oshkalo and Roman Chekhun, died.
(Ukraine)	13 March	MiG-29	Ukrainian military sources reported that a MiG-29 piloted by Cpt. Stepan Tarabalka was lost while defending Ukrainian airspace against Russian jetfighters.
(Ukraine)	14 March	Su-25	An Su-25 was shot down by Russian forces in Volnovakha, Donetsk Oblast. The pilot, Roman Vasyliuk, captured, was later released on 24 April in a prisoner swap.
(Ukraine)	15 March	MiG-29MU1	A MiG-29MU1 White 15 was shot down in Nova Nova Basan, Chernihiv Oblast. Journalists from France 24 recorded the ordnance next to the craft being destroyed by the Ukrainian military.
(Ukraine)	18 March	Unknown	A Russian missile strike on the Lviv State Aircraft Plant designed for MiG-29 repairs, which also contained foreign aircraft, left an unknown number of aircraft destroyed and damaged.
(Ukraine)	21 March	Su-24	An Su-24 piloted by Viacheslav Khodakivskyi was lost near Pokrovsky district, Zaporizhzhia. The pilot died.
(Ukraine)	22 March	Su-24	An Su-24 bomber, call sign White 49 was shot down below Russian lines in Izium; the pilot Oleksiy Kovalenko was killed, the navigator Serhiy Verbytsky was wounded but evaded capture.
(Ukraine)	23 March	MiG-29	A MiG-29 piloted by Commander Dmytro Chumachenko from the 204th Tactical Aviation Brigade was lost in air to air combat by Russian aircraft in Zhytomyr Oblast.
(Ukraine)	30 March	Su-24M	An Su-24M bomber, Blue 41, was shot down in Kirovohrad. The crew from 7th Tactical Aviation Brigade, Maksym Sikalenko, and navigator Kostiantin Horodnychev, were killed. A Su-24 was recorded damaged with a trail of smoke in Rivne, western Ukraine on social media.
(Ukraine) (2)	4 April	2 Il-76MD	Two Il-76MD from the 25th Transport Aviation Brigade were destroyed on the ground by Russian forces at Melitopol Air Base. One of the cargo planes destroyed was in operational state and the other undergoing repairs.
(Ukraine)	10 April	Su-25	An Su-25 was destroyed in the ground inside its hangar at Dnipro Airbase by Russian rocket attacks, a technician was wounded as well.
(Ukraine)	15 April	Su-25	An Su-25 was reported shot down by Russian forces in Izium; the downing of the fighter was recorded by a military IR camera. The pilot, Captain Yehor Serediuk, was reported killed near Izium on 15 April. Serediuk was awarded Hero of Ukraine.
(Ukraine)	30 April	Su-24M	An Su-24M, White 87, was damaged by a Russian missile in Kharkiv and crashed near Nova Praha, Kirovohrad Oblast. The crew survived.
(Ukraine)	6 May	Su-24M	An Su-24M, call sign White 12, crashed by a pilot error in Voznesensk airbase, Kherson. Both pilots survived.
(Ukraine)	14 May	Su-25	An Su-25, callsign Blue 45, from the 299th Tactical Aviation Brigade, piloted by Captain Serhiy Parkhomenko, was shot down in Huliaipole, Zaporizhzhia Oblast.
(Ukraine)	19 May	Su-24	An Su-24, call sign White 69 from the 7th Tactical Aviation Brigade was lost near Soledar during a combat mission. Pilots Lt. Colonel Ihor Khmara and navigator Mayor Illia Nehar died.
(Ukraine)	5 June	Su-27P1M	An Su-27P1M, call sign Blue 38, was shot down while flying at low altitude near Orikhiv, Zaporizhzhia Oblast. The pilot, former Commander of the 831st Tactical Aviation Brigade Lt. Col Dmytro Fisher died. The aircraft was reportedly destroyed by the debris of a Russian cruise missile or a large drone.
(Ukraine) (2)	16 June	MiG-29, Su-24	Two aircraft, a MiG-29 and a Su-24 bomber were destroyed on the ground in Voznesensk airbase, Mykolaiv Oblast, after a Russian attack.
(Ukraine)	26 June	Su-24MR	An Su-24MR, call sign White 84 was lost during a military mission on Snake Island in the Black Sea. Pilot Commander of the 40th Tactical Aviation Brigade Colonel Mykhailo Matiushenko died and navigator Major Yuriy Krasylnikov was missing.
(Ukraine)	before June	Su-24MR	An Su-24MR, was shot down during a bombing mission in Snake Island, both crewmen; Captain Victor Zhos and its navigator Sergei Pliguzov ejected and survived.
(Ukraine)	1 July	Su-27	An Su-27 was recorded damaged being transported for repairs.
(Ukraine) (4)	24 July	3 Su-27, 1 Su-24	Three Su-27s and one Su-24 were destroyed during a Russian missile strike on Kanatove Air Base, one official died and 17 other servicemen were injured.
(Ukraine)	26 July	Su-25M1	The Chief of Intelligence of the 299th Tactical Aviation Brigade, Oleksandr Kukurba, died while flying a combat mission on his Su-25M1, Blue 16 in Dnipro.
(Ukraine)	7 August	Il-76MD	An Il-76MD, with registration UR-76699, was recorded under Russian control in Melitopol Airport.
(Ukraine)	21 August	Su-27S	An Su-27S Blue 26 piloted by Lt. Col Pavlo Babych was lost during a combat mission. The pilot died.
(Ukraine)	7 September	Su-25	Ukrainian officials reported the death of 299th Tactical Aviation Brigade pilot Vadym Blahovisnyi while flying a combat mission on an Su-25.
(Ukraine)	19 September	Su-25	The remains of an Su-25 were found in Yehorivka, Donetsk Oblast. The aircraft was destroyed by a Russian 9K33 Osa.
(Ukraine)	25 September	MiG-29	A MiG-29 piloted by Major Taras Viktorovych Redkin was reported lost by Russian aircraft during a AGM-88 HARM mission.
(Ukraine)	29 September	Su-24M	An Su-24M was shot down by Russian surface-to-air missile in Kaluga, Kherson Oblast. The aircraft was recorded on video with one of its engines on fire before it crashed. The pilots Lt. Col Yevhen Soloviov and Captain Artem Khanko ejected.
(Ukraine) (2)	10–11 October	Su-27P1M, Su-24M	Two fighter jets were lost over Shishatsk, Poltava Oblast. One Su-27P1M, call sign Blue 58 from 39th Tactical Aviation Brigade piloted by Colonel Oleg Shupik was lost, Shupik died. Another aircraft, a Su-24M, Yellow 59, was shot down by an enemy missile after returning from a mission on 12 October. One of the pilots survived, the other, Dmytro Bortnyk died. Russian media reported on 27 November that an Su-24 was shot down in air combat by a MiG-31 with a missile.
(Ukraine)	12 October	MiG-29	A MiG-29, call sign Blue 10, was lost while intercepting Russian loitering ammunition Shahed 136 drones in Vinnytsia. One Shahed-136 detonated near the jet, shrapnel struck the cockpit forcing the pilot, Maj. Vadym Voroshylov to eject.
Total		106	10 L-39, 28 MiG-29, 15 Su-27, 24 Su-24, 20 Su-25, 3 An-26, 4 Il-76, 2 unidentified.

===== 2023 =====
Service	Date	Type	Description
(Ukraine)	7 January	MiG-29	A MiG-29 was destroyed in a friendly fire inccident by a Ukrainian Army 9K33 Osa near Ostrivske, Pokrovsk, Donetsk Oblast.
(Ukraine)	27 January	Su-25	An Su-25, Blue 37, was shot down by an enemy jet fighter near Kramatorsk resulting in the death of 299th Tactical Aviation Brigade pilot Danilo Murashko.
(Ukraine)	10 February	MiG-29	A MiG-29 was shot down while intercepting Shahed-136 loitering munition, reportedly in the area of Pishchanka, Vinnytsia Oblast. The pilot, Lieutenant Dmytro Shklyarevskyi, ejected but was injured and hospitalized.
(Ukraine)	1 March	Su-24	An Su-24M was shot down near Bakhmut. Both crewmembers, lieutenant colonel Viktor Volynets and senior lieutenant Solomennikov, were killed.
(Ukraine)	17 March	L-39M1	An L-39M1, codename White 15, crashed during a mission near Malyi Klyuchiv, Ivanoo-Frankivsk. The pilot ejected.
(Ukraine)	28 March	Su-27	An Su-27, call sign Blue 30, was lost alongside its pilot Major Denis Kirilyuk while it was intercepting Russian loitering ammunition Shahed 136 drones near Myrhorod, Poltava.
Ministry of Defence of Ukraine	5 April	A-22 Foxbat	Substantially damaged after forced landing near Butovsk, Bryansk Oblast. Pilot was captured by the Russian Federal Security Service. The civilian pilot was employed by the Ukrainian Main Directorate of Intelligence.
Ministry of Defence of Ukraine	7 May	A-32 Vixxen	Substantially damaged after forced landing in Podgornyi, Tula Oblast. Pilot was captured by the Russian Federal Security Service. The civilian pilot was employed by the Ukrainian Main Directorate of Intelligence.
(Ukraine)	27 April	MiG-29	A MiG-29MU1, White 24 crashed near Cherkasy International Airport. Likely by a pilot error or mechanical issue.
(Ukraine) (5)	29 May	Unknown	A Russian missile attack on Starokostiantyniv Air Base left 5 aircraft disabled or damaged according to Ukrainian officials.
(Ukraine)	2 June	MiG-29	MiG-29 call sign White 12 was shotdown killing Vladyslav Savieliev, call sign "Nomad", during combat mission on Pokrovsk, Donetsk Oblast. He was a MiG-29 pilot who participated in a US-sponsored training program at Columbus Air Force Base, Mississippi.
(Ukraine)	24 July	MiG-29	A debris of a lost MiG-29 near Bakhmut was recorded in social media.
(Ukraine) (2)	25 August	2 L-39 Albatros	Two L-39 Albatros aircraft collided in Zhytomyr Oblast. Ukrainska Pravda reported the death of three pilots; Majors Andrii Pilshchykov call sign Juice, Viacheslav Minka and deputy commander of the 40th Tactical Aviation Brigade, Serhii Prokazin.
(Ukraine)	11 September	MiG-29	A MiG-29 was hit and damaged by Russian ZALA Lancet kamikaze drone at Krivoi Rog Air Base.
(Ukraine) (2)	23 September	2 Unknown	Two aircraft, presumably MiG-29 or Su-25 were destroyed at Krivoi Rog Air Base.
(Ukraine)	25 September	MiG-29	A MiG-29 was destroyed at Kulbakino Air Base, Mykolaiv.
(Ukraine)	10 October	Su-25	An Su-25 was destroyed by a ZALA Lancet 3 drone attack on the tarmac of Dolgintsevo air base near Krivoi Rog Air Base.
(Ukraine) (2)	29 October	2 MiG-29	Two MiG-29s were destroyed in the ground in Kulbakino airbase.
(Ukraine)	23 November	MiG-29	One MiG-29s piloted by codename pilot Jeff was shotdown during a HARM mission on Donetsk. The pilot survived.
(Ukraine)	22 December	Su-27	An Su-27, Blue 53 was lost over Ozerne Airfield during a Geran-2 attack. Pilot Mayor Stanislav Romanenko was killed.
Total		27	3 L-39, 10 MiG-29, 2 Su-27, 2 Su-25, 1 Su-24, 1 A-22 Foxbat, 1 A-32 Vixxen, 7 Unknown.

===== 2024 =====
Service	Date	Type	Description
(Ukraine)	5 January	MiG-29	A MiG-29GT, call sign 405, was lost to enemy fire during a combat mission. Pilot Vladyslav Zalistovskyi, call sign "Blue Helmet", from the 114th Tactical Aviation Brigade died.
(Ukraine)	7 February	Su-25	A Su-25, Blue 21 from the 299th Tactical Aviation Brigade was shot down by a Russian Su-35 during combat sortie over Ukraine, The pilot commander Vladyslav Rykov died.
(Ukraine)	8 March	MiG-29	A MiG-29, previously tail number 2123 in Slovenian Air Force, was shot down over north of Shevchenko, Donetsk. Pilot Andriy Tkachenko died.
(Ukraine)	20 March	L-39	An Aero Albatros L-39 was destroyed by a Zala drone in Kulbakino, Mykolaiv Oblast.
(Ukraine) (3)	18 April	3 MiG-29	Three MiG-29s of the 114th Tactical Aviation Brigade were damaged by Russian cluster munition at Dnipro International Airport.
(Ukraine)	20 April	MiG-29	A MiG-29s was destroyed by Russian missile strike at Dnipro International Airport.
(Ukraine)	27 April	MiG-29	A MiG-29MU1 call sign White 24 of the 40th Aviation Brigade was lost during a mission the pilot Lt. Col Valentin Korenchuk died.
(Ukraine)	30 April	MiG-29	A MiG-29MU1 call sign White 22 made an emergency landing in a field north of Marina Roscha in Dnipropetrovsk Oblast. The aircraft was damaged but repairable.
(Ukraine)	17 May	Su-27	A Su-27PU2M, Blue 73, piloted by lieutenant colonel Denis Vasylyuk of the 831st Tactical Aviation Brigade was shot down Metalivka, Kharkiv Oblast by a Russian Su-35S, the pilot Denis Vasilyuk was killed.
(Ukraine)	22 May	MiG-29	A MiG-29 was destroyed on the ground at Dnipro Airport, Dnipropetrovsk Oblast.
(Ukraine)	6 June	Su-25	A Su-25 was damaged beyond repair by a Lancet loitering munition drone at the Kryvyi Rih air base.
(Ukraine)	10 June	Su-27	A Su-27UB was damaged beyond repair by an Iskander attack on Myrhorod Air Base.
(Ukraine)	11 June	Su-25	Another Su-25 was destroyed by a Lancet loitering munition attack at the Kryvyi Rih air base.
(Ukraine) (6)	1 July	6 Su-27	Two Su-27s were destroyed and four damaged as a result of Russian Iskander-M missile strike on Myrhorod Air Base in Poltava Oblast.
(Ukraine)	3 July	MiG-29	A MiG-29 was destroyed during Russian Iskander-M missile strike on Dolgintsevo Air Base in Dnepropetrovsk Oblast.
(Ukraine)	29 July	Su-25	A Su-25 was destroyed in the ground by Russian Lancet strike in Kryvyi Rih.
(Ukraine)	12 August	Su-27	A Su-27 was damaged in the ground at Myrhorod Air Base, Poltava Oblast.
(Ukraine)	12 August	MiG-29	A MiG-29, White 72, piloted by Olexander Migulya was shot down in a combat mission by a Russian Su-30.
(Ukraine)	16 August	MiG-29	A MiG-29, White 94, was destroyed on the ground by Russian Iskander M strike in Dnipro Airport.
(Ukraine)	22 August	L-39	An Aero Albatros L-39 suffered an accident during flight when a stork impacted the canopy injuring Pilot Sergei Pluguzov, he ejected but died, the damaged L-39 was successfully landed by navigator Viktor Zhos.
(Ukraine)	26 August	F-16	A ex-Danish Air Force F-16, Serial Number 80-3600 from 107th Separate Aviation Wing, was lost in Ukraine during a Russian missile and drone attack, according to US officials. Pilot Lt. Col. Oleksii "Moonfish" Mes was killed.
(Ukraine)	27 August	Su-24	A Su-24 was destroyed on the ground by Russian attacks on Starokostiantyniv Air Base, Khmelnytskyi Oblast.
(Ukraine)	22 November	MiG-29	A MiG-29 was destroyed in the ground at Dnipro International Airport by an Iskander missile.
(Ukraine)	14 December	Su-25	A Su-25, Blue 27, of the 299th Tactical Aviation Brigade was shot down by Russian S-400 defence system near Kherson Oblast. The pilot Vladislav Igorevich Solop was killed.
Total		31	2 L-39, 1 F-16, 13 MiG-29, 9 Su-27, 5 Su-25, 1 Su-24.

===== 2025 =====
Service	Date	Type	Description
(Ukraine)	2 February	Su-27P1M	A Su-27P1M, Blue 59, of the 831st Tactical Aviation Brigade was shot down near Pokrovsk, Donetsk Oblast by Russian aircraft. The pilot Cpt. Ivan Bolotov was killed.
(Ukraine)	2 March	Su-25	The wreckage of a previously operational Su-25s, Blue 23 were recorded in a Ukrainian documentary of the 299th Tactical Aviation Brigade. The footage was taken around Autumn 2024 and was released on 2 March 2025.
(Ukraine)	12 April	F-16AM	A F-16AM Block 20 of the 299th Tactical Aviation Brigade was shot down by a Russian missile during an operational mission, the Pilot Cpt. Pavlo Ivanov was killed.
(Ukraine)	28 April	Su-27	A Su-27, Blue 36, of 831st Tactical Aviation Brigade was lost during a mission repelling Russian drone attacks in an undisclosed location, the pilot Nikolay Klubnikin ejected and survived.
(Ukraine)	16 May	F-16	A F-16 from the 107th Separate Aviation Wing was lost during an operational mission amid Russian drone attacks. The pilot ejected and survived.
(Ukraine)	29 June	F-16	A F-16 from 107th Separate Aviation Wing, crashed after drone debris hit the aircraft during a Russian drone attack. The pilot Lt Col. Maksym Ustymenko died.
	12 July	An-26	An An-26 of the State Emergency Service of Ukraine was destroyed in the ground during a Russian attack on Chernovtsy Airport.
(Ukraine)	19 July	Yak-52	A Yak-52 from Odesa branch of Ukrainian Civil Air Patrol, subordinated to 11th Army Aviation Brigade was lost during a combat mission attempting to shoot down Geran-2 drones. Pilot Col. Konstantin Oborin and gunner Senior Sergeant Roman Kutsenko were killed.
(Ukraine)	22 July	Mirage 2000	A Dassault Mirage 2000-5F crashed during a mission in Volyn Oblast, the pilot ejected.
(Ukraine)	23 August	MiG-29	A MiG-29, callsign White 20, was lost under unknown circumstances during night landing at an undisclosed airbase. Pilot Maj. Serhiy Bondar was killed.
(Ukraine)	11 September	Su-27	A Su-27 piloted by Maj. Oleksandr Borovyk from 39th Tactical Aviation Brigade was lost during a combat mission in Zaporizhzhya front.
(Ukraine)	8 December	Su-27	A Su-27 piloted by Yevgeny Ivanov from the 39th Tactical Aviation Brigade was lost during a combat mission.
Total		12	1 An-26, 3 F-16, 1 MiG-29, 1 Mirage 2000, 4 Su-27, 1 Su-25, 1 Yak-52

===== 2026 =====
Service	Date	Type	Description
(Ukraine)	9 March	Su-27	A Su-27, piloted by Oleksandr Dovhach, the Commander of the 39th Tactical Aviation Brigade, was lost during a combat mission.
(Ukraine)	16 June	Su-24M	A Su-24M, call sign Blue 24, piloted by Major Bohdan Zaharulko and Sr. Lt. Bohdan Babenko, crashed in Khmelnytskyi Oblast. Both pilots were killed.
(Ukraine) (2)	27 June	2 MiG-29	A MiG-29 was lost during a combat mission on Poltava, the pilot survived. The same day the footage of a Russian Geran-4 drone attack on a Voznesensk Air Base left one MiG-29 destroyed outside his reinforced shelter.
(Ukraine)	29 July	F-16	A F-16 crashed during a combat mission intercepting drones on Kremenchuk, the pilot ejected and survived.
(Ukraine)	10 August	MiG-29	A MiG-29 was lost during a combat mission over Odesa, the aircraft caught fire after firing an Air-vs-air missile, the pilot ejected.
(Ukraine)	9 September	MiG-29	A MiG-29 was destroyed in the ground at the Vasylkiv Air Base in Kyiv by a Russian Geran-4 drone attack.
(Ukraine)	1 October	MiG-29	A MiG-29 was shot down over Zaporizhzhia, by a Russian missile. The pilot Captain Marat Mambetov was killed.
Total		8	1 F-16, 5 MiG-29, 1 Su-24, 1 Su-27

==== Rotary-wing aircraft ====
===== 2022 =====
Service	Date	Type	Description
(Ukraine)	28 February	Mi-8	A Mil Mi-8 from the 16th Army Aviation Brigade was shot down by Russian forces over Makariv, Kyiv Oblast. The crew of three died.
(Ukraine)	4 March	Mi-24	A Mil Mi-24 from the 11th Army Aviation Brigade was shot down by Russian forces over Velyka Novoselka. The crew of two; Sergei Glynenko and Flight Engineer Yuri Pentela were killed.
(Ukraine) (2)	6 March	2 Mi-8	Two Mil Mi-8 helicopters from the 18th Army Aviation Brigade were shot down by a Russian Su-35. The four crew members, Cpt. Serhiy Bondarenko, Cpt. Oleksandr Chuiko, Major Kostiantyn Zebnytskyi, and Cpt. Vladyslav Horban, died.
(Ukraine) (3)	8 March	2 Mi-8, 1 Mi-24	During a raid on Russian-controlled territory three Ukrainian helicopters were lost. One Mi-8 from the 11th Army Aviation Brigade piloted by Col. Oleh Hehechkori were lost near Kyiv. The second Mi-8 was shot down by a Russian missile and the crew, Ivan Pepeliashko and Oleksiy Chyzh were the only survivors. Both were captured by Russian soldiers and later released after a prisoner swap. A Mi-24 from the 16th Army Aviation Brigade (Ukraine) was lost over Brovary, Kyiv Oblast. Pilots Col. Oleksandr Maryniak and Cpt. Ivan Bezzub were killed.
(Ukraine)	10 March	Mi-8	A Mi-8MTV-5 Army helicopter was damaged by Russian missiles while in storage in "Motor Sich" facilities in Zaporizhia.
(Ukraine)	15 March	Mi-8	A Mil Mi-8 from the 11th Army Aviation Brigade was lost near Marinka by a Russian missile. Three officers were killed, pilot Oleksandr Borys and Lieutenants Oleksandr Lazovsky, and Leonid Tymoshenko.
(Ukraine)	22 March	Mi-8	A Mil Mi-8 was destroyed by Russian forces in Kyiv, the pilot Col. Vyacheslav Voronyi was shot down but managed to survive.
(Ukraine) (3)	25 March	3 Mil Mi-2	Russian forces captured Kherson International Airport along with one Mil Mi-8, two Mil Mi-24, and three Mil Mi-2 helicopters parked there. In November, both Mi-8 and Mi-24 helicopters were recaptured by Ukrainian forces.
(Ukraine) (2)	31 March	2 Mi-8	One Mi-8 shoot down in Rybatskoe, during the Siege of Mariupol, as they attempted to evacuate Azov Regiment officials; Of the crew and passengers only two crewmen survived and were captured; the remaining 15 died. Another Mi-8 was attacked by Russian forces, a MANPADs stuck the port engine but failed to detonate, the helicopter returned to his base with 22 wounded, but could not fly again.
(Ukraine) (2)	5 April	2 Mi-8	Two Mi-8 helicopters were shot down in Velyka Novoselka during the last rescue and supply operations around Mariupol. One Mi-8 was hit in the fuel tank at least 5 crewmembers died. The second Mi-8 was shot down by MANPADs two crewmen died one was captured.
(Ukraine)	15 April	Mi-8MSB	The remains of a Mil Mi-8MSB was discovered in northern Ukraine; the helicopter was carrying a cargo of APFSDS-T tank rounds.
(Ukraine)	23 April	Mi-24	A Mil Mi-24 from the 11th Army Aviation Brigade was shot down by Russian forces over the village of Oleksandrivka, Kharkiv Oblast. Pilots Capt. Serhiy Kolisnichenko and Cpt. Oleh Skliar were killed.
(Ukraine) (2)	23 April	2 Mi-24	Two Mil Mi-24 helicopters from 12 Army Aviation Brigade were lost in Donetsk Oblast, four servicemen; Mayor Viktor Panasyuk, Mhkola Muryachuck, Cptn Maksym Shendrikov and Pavlo Popovych died.
(Ukraine) (2)	4 May	2 Mi-24P	Two Mil Mi-24P of the 11th Army Aviation Brigade were attacked by Russian forces in the military airfield of the city of Artsyz, Odesa region, during Ukrainian Snake Island assaults. One was damaged beyond repair and other lost his rotor blades.
(Ukraine)	7 May	Mi-14	A Mil Mi-14 helicopter, codename Yellow 34, from the 10th Naval Aviation Brigade piloted by Colonel Ihor Bedzai, Commander of the 10th Naval Aviation Brigade and Mykhailo Zaremba was shot down by a Russian aircraft near Odesa after returning from a mission on Snake Island.
(Ukraine)	7 May	Mi-8MSB	The remains of a Mil Mi-8MSB were discovered.
(Ukraine)	9 May	Mi-24	During a Russian attack with P-800 Oniks missiles, an Mi-24 helicopter was destroyed in the ground on the east of Artsyz, Odesa airport. One person was killed.
(Ukraine)	16 June	Mi-8	A Mil Mi-8 piloted by Serhiy Oleksandrovych Meheda was destroyed by enemy fire near the village of Adamivka, Donetsk Oblast.
(Ukraine)	22 May	Mi-24	A Army Aviation Mil Mi-24 helicopter crash site was photographed in Ukrainian Social Media.
(Ukraine)	13 July	Mi-8	A Mil Mi-8 helicopter from the 16th Army Aviation Brigade (Ukraine) was lost during a combat mission in Presivchivka, Donetsk Oblast. The three crew members, Cmdr. Yevhen Kopotun, pilot Nazar Kryl, and technician Bohdan Lozovyi, died.
(Ukraine)	2 July	Unknown	An unidentified military helicopter piloted by Yevhen Kachai and Pavlo Bordyugov crashed in Kryvyi Rih Raion, Dnipropetrovsk Oblast.
(Ukraine)	8 August	Mi-2	A Mil Mi-2MSB cargo helicopter, bort number 02, crashed in Vyshnyvka, Vinnytsia. The crew of Pilot Vadym Kravets, Ivan Sholomii. Denis Lukov were killed. The passengers Commander Oleksiy Myrhorodskyi, Lt. Colonel Anton Lystopad and Pilot Colonel Yuriy Pohorilyi were killed as well.
(Ukraine)	21 August	Mi-8	An Mi-8 was shot down by Russian forces in Kharkiv. The helicopter was carrying S-8 unguided rockets. The pilots survived, as the helicopter was hit at low altitude.
(Ukraine)	31 October	Mi-8	An Mil Mi-8, call sign 843, crashed in Konstiantynivka, Donetsk Oblast.
(Ukraine)	11 November	Mil Mi-8	A Mil Mi-8 helicopter, number 239, from the 456th Transport Aviation Brigade was reported lost with three of its crew. The helicopter was hit by a MANPAD during a mission in Donetsk, Msg Vitaliy Golda pilot, Lt. Col Sergey Khomik, and Mj. Viktor Penkovyi were killed.
(Ukraine)	30 November	Mi-8MTS	Remains of an Mi-8MTS helicopter were recorded in Zaporizhzhia. Date of the shootdown is unknown, the crew likely survived.
(Ukraine)	11 December	Mi-8	A Mil Mi-8, call sing Black 234, was shot down in Kostiantynivka by a Russian MiG-31. Pilots Vladyslav Levchuk and Maxim Fedorov were reported killed that day in Bakhmut, Donetsk.
(Ukraine)	19 December	Mi-8	A Mil Mi-8 was shot down by DPR People Militia near Pervomayskoye, Tonenkoye, near Donetsk during combat. Another helicopter escaped. Two servicemen, Col. Sergei Khomikand, Lt. Col Oleksandr Zubach and Lt. Col Stanislav Gulov were killed.
Total		37	4 Mi-2, 22 Mi-8, 1 Mi-14, 9 Mi-24, 1 unidentified.

===== 2023 =====
Service	Date	Type	Description
	18 January	Eurocopter EC225 Super Puma	A helicopter carrying Ukrainian government officials crashed into a nursery and residential building in Brovary, Kyiv Oblast. The Ukrainian Minister of Internal Affairs Denys Monastyrsky, Deputy Minister of Internal Affairs Yevhen Yenin, and state secretary Yuriy Lubkovych were among the dead. The deputy head of Ukraine's presidential office, Kyrylo Tymoshenko, said the minister had been en route to a "hot spot" when his helicopter crashed. The nine people on board the aircraft died, while the other casualties were locals "bringing their children to the kindergarten", according to Tymoshenko. The helicopter was an Airbus H225 operated by the Ministry of Internal Affairs. It was confirmed by a CNN news crew onsite after remnants of flight manuals among the debris were found.
(Ukraine)	21 January	Mi-8	A Mil Mi-8 was recorded shot down by Wagner forces using MANPADs in Bakhmut.
(Ukraine)	29 January	Mi-8	A Mil Mi-8 was shot down by near Novodarivka, Zaporizhzhia Oblast.
(Ukraine)	31 January	Mi-2	A Mil Mi-2 was lost near Poltava. Both crew members, pilot Valdyslav Stankevych and Commander Henadiy Butenko, were killed.
(Ukraine)	13 February	Mi-8MSB-V	A Mil Mi-8MSB-V, call sign Yellow 88, was damaged under unknown circumstances. It was spotted during transport.
(Ukraine)	14 February	Mi-8	A wreck of a Mil Mi-8 with digital camouflage was filmed from the cockpit of another Mi-8. It is unclear when and where it was lost.
(Ukraine)	18 February	Mi-8	A Mil Mi-8 was shot down by Wagner forces near Bakhmut.
(Ukraine)	17 May	Mi-24	A Mil Mi-24 was damaged during combat.
(Ukraine)	4 June	Mi-24	A Mil Mi-24 crashed in Donbas.
(Ukraine)	9 June	Mi-17V	A Mi-17V-5, Serial Number 846, was lost alongside one of its crewmembers, Vladyslav Zozulay, in Kharkiv.
(Ukraine)	1 August	Mi-24	A Mil Mi-24 was shot down by Russian forces in the area of Mykhailivka, Beryslav Raion, Kherson Oblast.
(Ukraine) (2)	29 August	2 Mi-8	Two Mil Mi-8 helicopters, 837 and 839 from the 18th Army Aviation Brigade were lost in a mission on Kramatorsk. Six airmen died.
(Ukraine)	12 October	Mi-24	A Mi-24 helicopter, 209 Black, from 18th Army Aviation Brigade crashed south of the town of Mykolaivka, Synelnykove Raion, Dnipropetrovsk Oblast. The helicopter was damaged.
(Ukraine)	20 October	Mi-24	A Mi-24PU1 helicopter, was shot down near Chasiv Yar, Donetsk Oblast, a Mil Mi-8 was recorded on a SAR mission to retrieve the survivors next to the downed craft. The Commander of the 16th Helicopter Brigade, Sergei Novosad, died in the incident.
(Ukraine) (2)	9 November	2 Mi-8	The remains of two Mil Mi-8 were recorded in a dump.
(Ukraine)	8 December	Mi-8	The remains of an Mi-8 helicopter were recorded in video, likely in Kherson Oblast.
Total		18	1 Mi-2, 10 Mi-8, 1 Mi-17, 5 Mi-24, 1 EC225

===== 2024 =====
Service	Date	Type	Comments
(Ukraine)	13 February	Mi-17V-5	A Mil Mi-17V-5 was shot down by Russian forces near Robotyne, either by a MANPAD or ATGM. From the crew of three, two died, including Vadim Pokataev.
(Ukraine) (2)	12 March	Mi-17, Mi-8	Three Mil Mi helicopters were attacked by Russian fire and precision strikes in Novopavlovka, ending with one Mi-17 and one Mi-8 helicopters destroyed. The 12th Army Aviation Brigade announced the death of two of its pilots.
(Ukraine)	17 March	Mi-24	A Mil Mi-24 helicopter was shot down by the 138th Separate Guards Motor Rifle Brigade using MANPAD near Lukashivka in Sumy Oblast. Drone footage showed the wreckage of the helicopter. Pilot Vitaly Pleka of the 16th Separate Army Aviation Brigade was killed.
(Ukraine)	17 March	Mi-8	A Mil Mi-8 helicopter was shot down in Kherson Region, the Commander died, while two crewmen survived.
(Ukraine) (2)	11 May	2 Mi-24	Two Mil Mi-24 helicopters were destroyed in the ground by Russian fire in Manvelivka, Dnipropetrovsk Oblast. Four 11th Separate Army Aviation Brigade servicemen were killed: Anatoly Skiba, Oleksandr Atasov, Dmytro Kokorin and Serhiy Nazarchuk.
(Ukraine)	2 July	Mil Mi-24	A Mi-24 attack helicopter was destroyed by Russian cluster munition strike on Poltava Air base.
(Ukraine)	9 July	Mi-8	A Mi-8, Black 241 from 12th Army Aviation Brigade was shot down by Russian forces in the Northern region. Four crewmen were killed.
(Ukraine)	19 July	Mi-8	A Mi-8MSB-V, Black 160 from 11th Army Aviation Brigade crashed in Kirovograd Oblast.
(Ukraine)	29 July	Mi-8	A Mi-8, was recorded dumped next to a field in Russian controlled Ukraine.
(Ukraine)	1 August	Mi-2	A Mi-2MSB, Yellow 101 was reported lost in a crash during a flying training exercise performed by the National University of the Ukrainian Air Force near Kharkiv. Two pilots died.
(Ukraine)	22 October	Mi-24PU1	A Mi-24PU1, bortnumber 605 crashed in Lviv oblast, the crew of 3 were wounded with the airframe suffering damage on both rotors and fuselage.
Total		13	1 Mi-2, 5 Mi-8, 2 Mi-17, 5 Mi-24

===== 2025 =====
Service	Date	Type	Comments
(Ukraine)	15 January	Mi-17V-5	A Mi-17V-5 helicopter, bort number 153 Black, of the 11th Army Aviation Brigade crashed under unknown circunstances in Ukraine. The airframe was heavily damaged.
(Ukraine)	14 February	Mi-8MT	A Mi-8MT variant helicopter was recorded crashed in Ukraine.
(Ukraine)	22 February	Sea King HU.5	A Westland Sea King HU.5, bortnumber White 51, of the 10th Naval Aviation Brigade crash landed near Mykolaiv due to mechanical issue and suffered substantial damage.
(Ukraine)	13 May	Mi-24V	A Mi-24V attack helicopter, bort number 224 Black, former North Macedonian Army, of the 12th Army Aviation Brigade crashed in Lviv Oblast during a training flight.
(Ukraine)	24 September	Mi-8	A Mi-8 helicopter was destroyed on Kamyanka Aerodrome, north of the city of Dnipro, during Russian 9K723 Iskander-M ballistic missile strike.
(Ukraine)	17 December	Mi-24	A Mi-24 attack helicopter, bort number 292 Black, of the 12th Army Aviation Brigade was destroyed over Zolotonosha Raion, Cherkasy Oblast during a combat mission, all four crew members died.
Total		6	2 Mi-8, 1 Mi-17, 2 Mi-24, 1 Sea King

===== 2026 =====
Service	Date	Type	Description
(Ukraine) (2)	23 January	Mi-24, Mi-8	A Mi-24 was destroyed in the ground by Geran-2 drones with optical cameras on Mala Vyska Airfield on Kirovograd. Another helicopter Mi-8 was damaged as well.
(Ukraine)	9 February	Mi-24	A Mi-24 was lost with his crew in Kherson, during a combat mission, according to the report of the 11th Separate Army Brigade.
(Ukraine)	6 March	Mi-8	A Mi-8 was destroyed in the ground by a Geran-2 drone in Mykhailivka, Dnipropetrovsk Oblast.
(Ukraine)	30 June	Mi-8	A Mi-8 was lost while intercepting Russian drones over Starytskivka, Poltava Oblast. The crew of four died.
(Ukraine)	31 July	Mi-8	A Mi-8 from the 11th Army Aviation Brigade, crashed on Kirovograd Oblast during a combat mission.
(Ukraine)	4 September	unknown	A Ukrainian MOD HUR helicopter was destroyed on the ground at Kyiv Zhuliany Airport by Russian drones.
(Ukraine)	22 October	Mi-24	A Mi-24, stationed at the airfiled of Myrhorod was destroyed by a Russian Geran-4 drones.
Total		8	4 Mi-8, 3 Mi-24, 1 unidentified

==== Unmanned combat aerial vehicle (UCAV) ====
===== 2022 =====
Service	Date	Aircraft	Comment
(Ukraine) (4)	24 February	4 Bayraktar TB2	Four TB2 drones were abandoned in Chuhuiv Airbase and subsequently destroyed on the ground by Ukrainian Forces, amid Russian rocket attacks.
(Ukraine)	4 March	Bayraktar TB2	A TB2 was destroyed on the ground in Kulbakino Air Base, Mykolaiv.
(Ukraine)	8 March	Tu-141	A Tu-141 reconnaissance drone crashed in Belozerka, Kherson region. Ukraine was the only known operator of the drone.
(Ukraine)	7 March	Bayraktar TB2	The remains of a shot-down TB2 were recorded in Zhytomyr.
(Ukraine)	9 March	Bayraktar TB2	TB2, tail number T223, was lost under unknown circumstances in Crimea. Images surfaced on 18 February 2023.
(Ukraine)	11 March	Tu-141	A Ukrainian Tu-141 reconnaissance drone armed with a bomb crashed in front of a student campus in Zagreb, Croatia after it ran out of fuel after flying over Hungary.
(Ukraine)	13 March	Tu-141	A Tu-141 reconnaissance drone was shot down by Russian forces in Crimea.
(Ukraine)	17 March	Bayraktar TB2	A TB2 was shot down over Kyiv; the Russian Ministry of Defense published images of the drone wreckage.
(Ukraine)	24 March	UJ-22	A UJ-22 Airborne UAV was shot down near Klintsy, Bryansk Oblast, Russia.
(Ukraine)	29 March	Bayraktar TB2	A TB2 was shot down, likely in eastern Ukraine.
(Ukraine)	30 March	UJ-22	A UJ-22 Airborne drone was reported shot down by Russian Pantsir S1 air defenses.
(Ukraine)	2 April	Bayraktar TB2	A TB2, serial number T187 was lost in Kherson.
(Ukraine)	11 April	Tu-143	A Tu-143 drone was shot down over Kharkiv by Russian forces and crashed near Oktyabrsky, Belgorod Oblast.
(Ukraine)	25 April	Bayraktar TB2	A TB2, registration number S49T, was shot down in Kursk Oblast, Russia, after allegedly attacking a Russian base. The drone was destroyed on its way back to his base.
(Ukraine) (2)	27 April	2 Bayraktar TB2	Two TB2 drones were reported shot down in Russia: one in Belgorod and another in Kursk. By 28 April 2022, Russian forces had successfully destroyed six Bayraktar TB2 drones as confirmed by imagery.
(Ukraine)	28 April	Tu-141	A Tu-141 reconnaissance drone was shot down during an attack on Russian-controlled Kherson.
(Ukraine)	29 April	Bayraktar TB2	A TB2, registration number S52 was shot down Russian forces in Novovodyane Luhansk.
(Ukraine)	30 April	Tu-143	A Tu-143 drone was shot down over Bryansk, Russia, by Russian forces.
(Ukraine)	1 May	Bayraktar TB2	A TB2, registration number S51T was shot down in Kursk Oblast, Russia.
(Ukraine)	6 May	Tu-143	A Tu-143 drone was shot down by Russian Pantsir S1 air defense near Krasny Khutor, Belgorod Oblast.
(Ukraine)	10 May	Tu-143	A Tu-143 drone was recorded crashed in Kharkiv Oblast.
(Ukraine)	20 May	Bayraktar TB2	A Bayraktar TB2 drone with tail number T274 was reported shot down in Vuhledar, Donetsk Oblast, by Russian air defenses.
(Ukraine)	23 May	Bayraktar TB2	The remains of a TB2, tail number 75, was recovered from Romanian territorial waters by Romanian Naval Forces. The wreckage was first discovered on 11 May 2022 about two nautical miles of Sulina. The drone was likely shot down during the Snake Island attacks conducted by Ukraine in the first week of May 2022.
(Ukraine)	23 May	Tu-143	A Tu-143 drone was shot down by Russian air defenses in Rostov, Russia.
(Ukraine)	29 June	Tu-141	A Tu-141 reconnaissance drone was shot down east of Kursk.
(Ukraine) (2)	3 July	2 Tu-143	Two Tu-143 reconnaissance drones were shot down in the direction of Kursk, head of the Kursk Oblast Roman Starovoyt reported.
(Ukraine)	21 July	Bayraktar TB2	A TB2 was shot down in Kharkiv Oblast as it attempted to enter Russian territory; images of the drone wreckage were displayed.
(Ukraine)	25 July	Bayraktar TB2	The remains of a TB2, tail number T29, were found in Kherson.
(Ukraine)	25 July	Bayraktar TB2	A TB2 drone with tail number U139 was reported shot down in Belgorod Oblast.
(Ukraine)	9 August	Bayraktar TB2	A TB2 drone with call sign 409 was shot down in southern Ukraine.
(Ukraine)	2 September	Bayraktar TB2	TB2 drone shot down by Russian air defense systems in Kherson Oblast.
(Ukraine)	29 November	Bayraktar TB2	The remains of a TB2 drone were published on social media near the Inhulets river, Mykolaiv.
(Ukraine)	24 December	Tu-141	A Tu-141 drone was shot down near Voronezh, Russia.
Total		38	23 Bayraktar TB-2, 6 Tu-141, 7 Tu-143, 2 UJ-22

===== 2023 =====
Service	Date	Aircraft	Comment
(Ukraine)	15 January	Bayraktar TB2	Downed using EW systems.
(Ukraine)	22 January	Bayraktar TB2	Wreckage found by Ukrainian authorities in Odesa Oblast, unknown circumstances.
(Ukraine)	23 January	Bayraktar TB2	Shot down by Air Defense Units of the 76th Guards Air Assault Division at Dniepr-Bug Estuary.
(Ukraine)	6 February	Tu-141	Crashed on Shevchenkovo, Konotop district, Sumy region.
(Ukraine)	8 February	Tu-141	While carrying an OFAB-100-120 bomb, it crashed near Kaluga, Russia.
(Ukraine)	23 February	Bayraktar TB2	Shot down in Kharkiv Oblast due to friendly fire.
(Ukraine)	28 February	Tu-141	Crashed while armed with explosives near village of Novyi, Giaginsky District.
(Ukraine)	28 February	UJ-22 Airborne	Crashed near gas compressor facility in Kolomensky District, Moscow Oblast.
(Ukraine)	25 April	UJ-22 Airborne	Crashed in Moscow Oblast.
(Ukraine)	5 May	Bayraktar TB2	Shot down by Ukrainian air defenses over Kyiv after loss of control.
(Ukraine)	12 May	Bayraktar TB2	Call sign U106 was shot down by Russian forces near Marinka.
(Ukraine)	17 July	Bayraktar TB2	Call sign T 263 was shot down by Russian Forces in Kherson Oblast, near Heroiskoye.
(Ukraine)	30 August	UJ-22 Airborne	UJ-22 drone downed by a Russian Mi-28N.
(Ukraine)	22 December	UJ-25 Skyline	Remains found in Russia. Crashed into the roof of a house.
Total		14	7 Bayraktar TB-2, 3 Tu-141, 3 UJ-22, 1 UJ-25

===== 2024 =====
Service	Date	Type	Description
Ministry of Defence of Ukraine	2 April	A-22 Foxbat	An Aeros Skyranger modified into UAV crashed in Yelabuga, Republic of Tatarstan, Russia.
Ministry of Defence of Ukraine	25 April	Aeros Skyranger	An Aeros Skyranger modified into UAV and carrying an OFAB-100-120 bomb crashed at an unknown field in Russia.
Ministry of Defence of Ukraine	23 May	A-22 Foxbat	An Aeroprakt A-22 Foxbat modified into UAV was shot down by Russian air defense over Nizhnekamsk, Republic of Tatarstan.
Ministry of Defence of Ukraine	28 July	Aeros Skyranger	An Aeros Skyranger modified into UAV crashed at an unknown field in Russia.
Ministry of Defence of Ukraine	21 August	A-22 Foxbat	An Aeroprakt A-22 Foxbat modified into UAV was shot down by Russian air defense near Olenegorsk, Murmansk Oblast.
(2)	6 November	A-22 Foxbat	Two Aeroprakt A-22 Foxbat modified into UAVs were shot down by Russian air defense near Kaspiysk Naval Base, Dagestan.
(2)	15 December	A-22 Foxbat	An Aeroprakt A-22 Foxbat modified into UAVs was shot down by Russian air defense near Grozny, Chechen Republic.
(2)	25 December	A-22 Foxbat	Two Aeroprakt A-22 Foxbats modified into UAV was shot down by Russian air defenses over Grozny, Chechnya and Malgobek, Ingushetia.
Total		10	8 A-22 Foxbat, 2 Skyranger

===== 2025 =====
Service	Date	Type	Description
Ministry of Defence of Ukraine	21 January	Aeros Skyranger	An Aeros Skyranger modified into UAV was shot down by Russian air defenses over Smolensk.
Ministry of Defence of Ukraine	15 June	A-22 Foxbat	An Aeroprakt A-22 Foxbat modified into UAV was shot down by Russian air defense over Yelabuga, Republic of Tatarstan.
Ministry of Defence of Ukraine	14 August	A-22 Foxbat	An Aeroprakt A-22 Foxbat modified into UAV crashed into a residential building in Rostov-on-Don.
Ministry of Defence of Ukraine	8 December	Aeros Skyranger	An Aeros Skyranger modified into UAV, number 89, crash landed near Selydove in Donetsk Oblast, behind the Russian frontline.
Ministry of Defence of Ukraine	9 December	A-22 Foxbat	An Aeroprakt A-22 Foxbat modified into UAV was shot down by Russian air defense near Grozny, Republic of Chechnya.
Ministry of Defence of Ukraine	14 December	Aeros Skyranger	An Aeros Skyranger modified into UAV was shot down over Pokrovsk by Russian FPV interceptor drone of the Rubicon Center.
Total		6	3 A-22 Foxbat, 3 Skyranger

==== Aircraft of civilian origin ====
===== 2022 =====
Date	Type	Description
24 February	Antonov An-225 Mriya	Destroyed on the ground at Hostomel Airport.
24 February	Antonov An-74	Registration number UR-74010 was destroyed by Russian forces during the Battle of Antonov Airport.
24 February	Antonov An-26	Registration number UR-13395 was destroyed during the battle for Hostomel.
24 February	Antonov An-124	Registration number UR-82009 was heavily damaged during the battle for Hostomel.
24 February	Antonov An-22	Registration UR-09307 was heavily damaged during the battle for Hostomel.
24 February	Antonov An-28	Registrations UR-NTE and UR-UZD were damaged during the battle for Hostomel.
24 February	Antonov/Taqnia An-132	The only prototype model Antonov/Taqnia An-132 with registration number UR-EXK was damaged beyond repair during the Battle of Antonov Airport. The left wing was damaged beyond repair, in addition to significant shrapnel damage to the engine and fuselage.
24 February	Antonov An-148	Registration UR-NTA was damaged during hostilities at Hostomel Airport. Footage shows moderate shrapnel damage to both the forward fuselage, wing box and tailplane areas of the aircraft.
24 February	Cessna 172 Cutlass	Registrations UR-LKS and UR-IFC stored in the Antonov An-225 hangar were heavily damaged by shrapnel during the Battle of Antonov Airport.
24 February	Tecnam P2002 Sierra	Registration UR-AAU operated by National Aviation University, it was damaged at Hostomel Airport.
24 February	Antonov An-12	UR-21510 and UR-11315 were destroyed during hostilities at Hostomel Airport.
24 February	Antonov An-140	UR-NTP was damaged during hostilities at Hostomel Airport.
24 February	Antonov An-72P	Yellow 06 was destroyed during hostilities at Hostomel Airport.
22 April	Antonov An-26	Lost in Zaporizhzhia Raion; of the crew of three, one crew member died the others two were wounded. Ukrainian officials said heavy fog was the cause of the crash.
7 May	L-39C Albatros, MiG-21UM, MiG-21bis	Four aircraft owned by the Odesa Aircraft Plant were destroyed during a Russian missile attack on Odesa Airport, with two others damaged. A MiG-21UM, L-39C Blue 02 (c/n 530540) and an ex-Algerian MiG-21bis (s/n 2231) were destroyed, L-39C (c/n 533221) was damaged beyond repair, and another two ex-Algerian MiG-21bis (s/n 2232 and s/n 2237) were damaged.
4 June	KhaZ-30	Registration UR-KVP was destroyed due to shelling at Korotych Airfield, near Kharkiv.
1 July	Antonov An-12	Registration UR-11316, damaged after skidding of the runway at Uzhhorod International Airport.
28 July	Antonov An-26	An-26B UR-ELI and An-26B-100 UR-ESC were destroyed and An-26B UR-ELE was damaged beyond repair in a Russian missile strike at Kropyvnytskyi Airport, Kirovohrad Oblast. All aircraft were owned by Air Urga.
28 July	Cessna 172	Cessna 172R UR-ELY of Air Urga and another Cessna 172 were destroyed in a Russian missile strike at Kropyvnytskyi Airport, Kirovohrad Oblast.
28 July	NARP-1 (uk)	NARP-1 light aircraft UR-WWB of National Aviation University was destroyed in a Russian missile strike at Kropyvnytskyi Airport, Kirovohrad Oblast.
2 September	Antonov An-74	Destroyed in a Russian missile strike at Kharkiv Aviation Plant.

===== 2024 =====
Date	Type	Description
unknown date	Extra EA-300, Sukhoi Su-31	Extra EA300SC UR-WIN and Sukhoi Su-31M UR-TOP were destroyed by a Russian strike at Odesa-Hydroport Airfield in Odesa.

===== 2025 =====
Date	Type	Description
4 April	ATR 72, Airbus A320, Airbus A321	Five aircraft of the Windrose Airlines were destroyed by a Russian drone strike at the Dnipro International Airport. The aircraft stored at the airport were two ATR 72-600 (registration UR-RWA and UR-RWC), an Airbus A320-214 (registration UR-WRW), and two Airbus A321-231 (registration UR-WRH and UR-WRJ).
27 April	Flight Design CTSW, Mooney M20, Pipistrel Virus	A Russian drone strike struck Zhytomyr Airport on 27 April. At least a Flight Design CTSW UR-GIK and a Pipistrel Virus SW UR-HUNT were damaged beyond repair, and a Mooney M20J UR-ALS was substantially damaged. Additionally, several aircraft with foreign registration were destroyed or damaged. (For aircraft with foreign registration, see below)

=== Russia ===
==== Fixed-wing aircraft ====
===== 2022 =====
Operator	Date	Type	Description
(Russia)	24 February	Su-25	Lost due to pilot error. Spokesman Major General Igor Konashenkov stated that the pilot ejected successfully and was rescued.
(Russia)	24 February	An-26	Registration number RF-36074 suffered an in-flight breakup and crashed in Voronezh Oblast, killing an undisclosed number of occupants. The preliminary cause is a technical malfunction.
(Russia)	24 February	Su-25SM	266th Attack Aviation Regiment plane piloted by Ruslan Rudnev was lost over Ukraine. Pilot died.
(Russia)	25 February	Su-30SM	Ukrainian forces attacked the Russian Air force base in Millerovo, destroying at least one Su-30SM on the ground with Tochka missiles.
(Russia)	27 February	Su-34	Registration number RF-81259, tail number Red 05 was shot down near Buzova airfield.
(Russia)	1 March	Su-34	Registration number RF-81251, tail number Red 31, was lost near Borodianka.
(Russia)	2 March	Su-25SM	Registration number RF-91961, tail number Red 07, of the 18th Attack Aviation Regiment was shot down over Irpin. Pilot ejected and escaped behind Russian lines.
(Russia) (2)	4 March	Su-25SM	Su-25, registration number RF-93026, tail number Red 08, was shot down near Volnovakha, pilot Ivan Vorobyov died. Su-25, RF-91958, tail number Red 04, was shot down in Kodra Bucha Raion, Kyiv Oblast, the pilot died.
(Russia)	5 March	Su-30SM	Registration number RF-33787, tail number Blue 45 was shot down in Bashtanka Raion. Both crew members, Major Aleksey Golovensky and Captain Aleksey Kozlov, were captured.
(Russia)	5 March	Su-30SM	A Su-30SM was lost in Ochakov, Mykolaiv Oblast, pilot by Lt. Colonel Aleksey Khasanov and Cpt Vasily Gorgulenko were killed.
(Russia) (2)	5 March	Su-34	Registration number RF-81879, tail number Red 24, was shot down near Chernihiv. Both pilots ejected. Ukrainian forces captured the pilot; the co-pilot died. Registration number RF-81864, tail number Red 26, was destroyed near Hrabivka, One pilot died.
(Russia)	6 March	Su-34	Registration number RF-95070, was shot down by Ukrainian air defenses near Kharkiv; one pilot was captured.
(Russia)	7 March	Su-25	Registration number RF-90969, tail number Yellow 28, of the 266th Attack Aviation Regiment, piloted by Oleg Chervov was lost during a combat mission in Ukraine. Chervov died.
(Russia)	8 March	Su-25	A fighter from the 368th Assault Aviation Regiment piloted by Sergey Volynets was lost. Volynets died and was posthumously awarded the Order of Courage.
(Russia)	10 March	Su-25	Registration number RF-91969, tail number Red 10 was shot down near Kyiv. Pilot Major Nikolai Prozorov died.
(Russia)	10 March	Su-34	A Su-34 crashed near Kazhan-Haradok in Belarus, 17 km from Luninets air base. Two crew ejected.
(Russia)	13 March	Su-30	A Su-30, registration number RF-81733, tail number Red 72 was shot down by Ukrainian defenses in Izyum, Kharkiv Oblast, pilot Serhiy Kosyk was captured, the other crewmember escaped.
(Russia)	14 March	Su-25	A Su-25, registration number RF-90965, 32 Yellow was damaged by enemy fire, likely MANPADS, but managed to return to its base.
(Russia)	14 March	Su-34	Registration number RF-95010, tail number Red 35 was found wrecked.
(Russia)	15 March	Su-30SM	A Su-30SM RF-81773, codename Red 62, was shot down and crashed in Bryhadyrivka Kharkiv Oblast. Lt. Col Yevgeny Kyslyakov and Capt. Aleksander Pozinich from 14th Guards Fighter Aviation Regiment, were killed.
(Russia)	16 March	Su-25SM	Registration number RF-93027, tail number Red 12, of the 18th Attack Aviation Regiment was found in Blystavytsya, Kyiv Oblast. The pilot reportedly ejected.
(Russia)	3 April	Su-35	Registration number RF-81752, tail number Red 61, near Izium, was downed and its pilot captured.
(Russia)	25 April	Su-34	Registration number RF-95808, tail number Red 24, part of the 47th Aviation Regiment, crashed in Balakliia, Kharkiv Oblast. Both pilots were recorded bailing out.
(Russia)	12 May	Su-25	Pilot Colonel Nicolai Markov was shot down in Popasna, while flying for a Russian PMC.
(Russia)	21 April	Su-34	Registration number RF-95858, tail number Red 43 was shot down near Zaporizhzhia.
(Russia)	18 May	Su-34	A Su-34 was reported shot down in Kharkiv, the pilot Cmdr. Vladimir Fetisov was reported killed.
(Russia)	22 May	Su-25	A Su-25 piloted by Major General (R) Kanamat Botashev was shot down Pylypchatyne, Bakhmut while flying for Wagner PMC.
(Russia)	27 May	Su-25SM	A Su-25M with registration number RF-95152, tail number Blue 15 was shot down near Chornobaivka. Pilot lieutenant Nikita Malkovsky was killed.
(Russia)	10 June	Su-25SM	Registration number RF-91957, tail number Red 3 was heavily damaged after being hit by MANPADS over Ukraine. The pilot made an emergency landing.
(Russia)	17 June	Su-25	Pilot error crashed registration number RF-91965, tail number Red-09 in Belgorod. Russian Fighter-Bomber Telegram channel published a headcam video footage of the pilot ejecting; he lived.
(Russia)	18 June	Su-25	Pilot Andrei Vladimirovich Fedorchukov was shot down with 9K38 Igla MANPADS in Svitlodarsk. Fedorchukov was working for the Wagner Group and was captured.
(Russia)	21 June	Su-25	A Su-25, registration number RF-90958, 23 Yellow crashed near Mankovo-Kalitvenskoe, Rostov, Russia. The pilot Vladimir Krot died.
(Russia)	3 July	Su-25	A Su-25, was shot down in the area of Sievierodonetsk. Pilot Captain Anton Mikhailovich Romanov was killed.
(Russia)	17 July	Su-34	Registartion number RF-95890, tail number Red 51 was shot down near Alchevsk, Luhansk Oblast. Possibly friendly fire.
(Russia)	19 July	Su-35S	Damaged and crashed in the vicinity of Shlyakhove, Beryslav Raion, Kherson Oblast. The pilot ejected. Footage of the wreckage was posted on February 4, 2023.
(Russia) (11)	9 August	7 Su-24, 4 Su-30	An explosion at Saky Airbase in Novofedorivka destroyed five Su-24s, damaged two, destroyed three Su-30s and damaged one.
(Russia)	18 August	Su-30SM	Remains of registration number RF-81771 tail number Red 60, were discovered near Mala Komyshuvakha, Izium. The fate of the pilots remained unknown.
(Russia)	22 August	Su-25	Shot down using 9K38 Igla MANPADs near Bakhmut.
(Russia)	7 September	Su-25SM	A Su-25 of registration number RF-95134, tail number Blue 04 was shot down by MANPAD fire near Volokhiv Yar, Kharkiv Oblast. The pilot Alexander Arzhanykh survived.
(Russia)	9 September	Su-34	Remains of Su-34, registration number RF-95004, tail number Red 20, were discovered near Izium. The fate of the crew is unknown.
(Russia)	11 September	Su-25	A Su-25 crashed during taking off from Millerovo air base, the pilot Danil Dolbik was killed.
(Russia)	11 September	Su-34	Shot down possibly by friendly fire near Vorontsivka in Crimea. Both crew members ejected safely.
(Russia) (2)	24 September	Su-34	Shot down and recorded; one engine caught fire and crashed, allegedly downed by MANPADS, in Hlushchenkove, Kharkiv Oblast. Registration number RF-95005, tail number Red 22, was recorded shot down by a missile and crashed in Petropavlivka, Kupiansk Raion. The crew ejected.
(Russia)	1 October	MiG-31	Crashed after takeoff on Belbek military airbase, Sevastopol. In early November satellite imagery showed the remains of a MiG-31 on the bottom of a cliff after the end of the runway.
(Russia)	2 October	Su-34	Remains of registration number RF-81852, tail number Red 09, were discovered near Lyman.
(Russia)	6 October	Su-34	Remains of a Su-34 were recorded at Popivka, Luhansk Oblast.
(Russia)	9 October	Su-24	On training mission, crash landed near Sibirki in Rostov Oblast and caught fire, possibly due to a technical malfunction. Both crew evacuated safely.
(Russia)	9 October	Su-25	Crashed in an accident in Rogalik, Rostov Oblast, 30 km from Millerovo airfield.
(Russia)	17 October	Su-34	A Su-34, registration number RF-81726, 20 Red, crashed into a residential building in Yeysk near the Sea of Azov during a training flight. Engine fire caused by a bird strike.
(Russia)	2 December	Su-24M	A Su-24M, registration number RF-93798, tail number Blue 48, operated by Wagner PMC, lost near Klishchiivka, south of Bakhmut. Pilot Alexander Antonov and navigator Vladimir Nikishin were killed.
(Russia)	3 December	Su-34	Images of a Russian Su-34 were displayed on media, footage of the wrecksite were displayed later on 3 January 2023.
(Russia) (2)	5 December	Tu-22M, Tu-95	Tu-22M, RF-34110, and a Tu-95 were damaged by long-range drone attack on the Dyagilevo and Engels-2 air bases.
(Russia)	9 December	Su-25SM	Damaged after an emergency gear-up landing at Primorsko-Akhtarsk Air Base in Krasnodar Krai.
(Russia)	Unknown date 2022	Su-25SM	The remains of a Su-25SM, Registration number RF-91968, tail number Blue 09 were recorded and released in 2024.
Total		68	1 MiG-31, 2 Su-35, 10 Su-30, 24 Su-25, 9 Su-24, 19 Su-34, 1 Tu-22, 1 Tu-95, 1 An-26.

===== 2023 =====
Operator	Date	Type	Description
(Russia)	5 January	Su-25	An Su-25 operated by PMC Wagner was shot down by a MANPAD over Vesela Dolyna Psychiatric Institute, Bakhmut, the pilot callsign "Maestro" ejected and was evacuated.
(Russia)	13 February	Su-24M	A Su-24, registration number RF-93799, tail number Blue 45, damaged by a MANPADS strike over Bakhmut. The crew, reportedly working for Wagner PMC, landed at the base.
(Russia)	23 February	Su-25SM	An Su-25SM, registration number RF-95143, tail number Yellow 37, crashed while returning to the base's airfield in Belgorod Oblast after performing a combat mission due to a technical malfunction. The pilot died, according to the Russian Ministry of Defense.
(Russia)	1 March	Su-25	Crashed somewhere in Ukraine. Pilot ejected and was evacuated by a Mi-8 on CSAR duty.
(Russia)	3 March	Su-34	Friendly fire incident over Yenakiieve, Donetsk Oblast. Crew member Major Alexander Bondarev died.
(Russia)	10 March	Su-27	Damaged in a partisan attack on Uglovoye airfield in Primorsky Krai. Video posted on 10 March 2023.
(Russia)	15 March	Su-25	Shot by the 93rd Brigade of Ukrainian Forces near Bakhmut and crashed in Zaitseve. The pilot, reportedly working for Wagner PMC, ejected.
(Russia)	7 April	Su-25	Shot down by airborne anti-aircraft unit near Oleksandrivka. The pilot probably ejected.
(Russia)	8 May	Su-24	Set on fire in a partisan attack on Novosibirsk Aircraft Production Association Plant. The aircraft was in storage and only the landing gear was damaged.
(Russia) (2)	13 May	Su-34, Su-35S	Both shot down by Ukrainian Patriot Defence Systems in Bryansk Oblast. The crewmen of the Su-34 Mikhail Chuprakov and Andrey Olennikov died. The pilot of the Su-35 Gleb Polyakov died.
(Russia)	24 June	Il-22M	A Il-22M-11, registration number RF-75917, was shot down in Voronezh Oblast by the Wagner Group during the Wagner Group rebellion.
(Russia)	29 June	Su-25	A Su-25 was recorded hit with Igla missile by anti-aircraft unit of 10th Mountain Assault Brigade.
(Russia)	17 July	Su-25	Crashed near Yeysk in the Sea of Azov.Southern Military District reported that it was conducting a test flight. The preliminary cause was engine failure. The pilot ejected and was rescued, but did not survive.
(Russia)	19 August	Tu-22M	A Tu-22M was destroyed on the ground of Soltsy-2 air base in Novgorod by a Ukrainian drone attack.
(Russia) (4)	29 August	Il-76	Four Il-76 were attacked by a Ukrainian drone attack at Pskov airfield, two were burned out, two were damaged.
(Russia)	29 September	Su-35	An Su-35 was shot down over Tokmak, possibly by friendly fire. The pilot was killed.
(Russia)	7 November	Su-24	The remains of an Su-24, registration number RF-92025, tail number Blue 48, were found in Soledar. Likely lost on 3 December 2022.
(Russia)	5 December	Su-24	Lost over the Black Sea, Ukraine claimed the aircraft was shot down by a Patriot Air Defense System.
(Russia)	17 December	Su-25	A Su-25 crashed during unknown circunstances, the pilot Dmitry Moiseev did not survive.
(Russia)	22 December	Su-34	Shot down in southern Ukraine, one confirmed destroyed by Telegram channel Fighterbomber.
Total		24	2 Su-35, 1 Su-27, 8 Su-25, 4 Su-24, 3 Su-34, 1 Il-22, 4 Il-76, 1 Tu-22M.

===== 2024 =====
Operator	Date	Type	Description
(Russia)	3 January	Su-34	Damaged, by Ukrainian saboteur that attempted to set it on fire at Chelyabinsk Shagol airfield.
(Russia)	14 January	A-50	A A-50, registration number RF-93966, 37 Red was shot down over the Sea of Azov. The crew of 8 died.
(Russia)	14 January	Il-22	A Il-22, registration number RF-95678, was damaged by a surface-to-air missile, but returned to a base. One crew member died due to shrapnel.
(Russia)	24 January	Il-76	A Il-76, registration number RF-86868 was shot down by a Patriot Defence Systems near Yablonovo, Belgorod Oblast. Transporting Ukrainian POWs according to Russian officials. 65 POWs, 6 crewmen and 3 guards died.
(Russia)	17 February	Su-35	Shot down over Eastern Ukraine; the pilot was evacuated by a CSAR helicopter mission.
(Russia)	19 February	Su-35	A Su-35 was shot down over Azov Sea near off Rybatske, the pilot Fedor Grabovetsky was killed. Possibly shot down by a Ukrainian MIM-104 Patriot.
(Russia)	24 February	A-50	A-50, RF-50610, Red 42 was shot down in Yeysk, more than 200 km from the frontline. Video appeared to show the shotdown.
(Russia)	28 March	Su-27	Crashed into the sea near Sevastopol due to a mechanic failure. Pilot ejected safely.
(Russia)	5 April	Be-200	A Be-200 was damaged by Ukrainian drone attack on Yeysk Air Base, Krasnodar Krai.
(Russia)	19 April	Tu-22M	A Tu-22M crashed near Stavropol due to an engine fire. Four crew members ejected but one died.
(Russia)	5 May	Su-34	A Su-34, registration number RF-95002, 21 Red, crashes during a combatmission near Valuyki, Belgorod.
(Russia) (4)	14 May	2 MiG-31s, 1 fighter, 1 Su-27	Two MiG-31 and one unidentified fighter were destroyed, another Su-27 was damaged and one ex-Ukrainian un operational MiG-29 stationed was destroyed on the ground following two presumed strikes with ATACMS at Belbek air base according to satellite imagery.
(Russia) (2)	19 May	Su-27P, Su-34	An Su-27P from the Russian Knights aerobatic team was destroyed by a Ukrainian UAV attack on Kushchevskaya Air Base, Krasnodar Krai. Another Su-34 was damaged.
(Russia)	8 June	Su-57	An Su-57 was damaged by drone attack at Akhtubinsk air base, Astrakhan Oblast.
(Russia)	23 July	Su-25	An Su-25 was shot down by 110th Mechanized Brigade in Provosk sector in Donbas.
(Russia)	27 July	Su-34	Crashed in Serafimovichsky Raion, Volgograd Oblast during training. Both crew ejected.
(Russia)	2 August	Su-34	Destroyed on the ground by Ukrainian drone attack on Morozovsk air base, Rostov Oblast, Russia.
(Russia) (4)	22 August	3 Su-34, 1 Su-24M	Ukrainian drone attack on Marinovka air base, Volgograd Oblast left one Su-34 destroyed on the ground and two damaged. A Su-24M was damaged as well.
(Russia)	11 September	Su-30	A Su-30 crashed in the Black Sea by an unknown reason, both crewmen died.
(Russia)	6 October	Su-25	Footage of the wreckage being transported in a truck was published the airframe with c/n 06090 likely lost before spring.
(Russia)	23 December	Su-25	Su-25SM Red 07 damaged in the canopy by a crash with a ZALA drone.
Total		28	2 MiG-31, 1 Su-57, 1 Su-30, 2 Su-35, 3 Su-27, 3 Su-25, 8 Su-34, 1 Su-24, 1 Tu-22M, 2 A-50, 1 Il-22, 1 Il-76, 1 Be-200, 1 unidentified.

===== 2025 =====
Operator	Date	Type	Description
(Russia)	1 February	Su-25	Wreckage recorded outside the base of Gvardeyskoye in Crimea.
(Russia)	8 February	Su-25	Shot down by Ukrainian 28th Separate Mechanized Brigade soldiers using Igla MANPADS near Toretsk. The pilot ejected and escaped.
(Russia)	22 March	Su-34	Damaged after an emergency gear-up landing at Lipetsk Air Base in Lipetsk Oblast.
(Russia)	2 May	Su-30SM	Su-30SM of 43rd Independent Naval Attack Aviation Regiment was shot down by Ukrainian MAGURA V5 drones armed with R-73 missiles in the Black Sea. The crew survived.
(Russia) (13)	1 June	8 Tu-95, 4 Tu-22M, 1 An-12	During a Ukrainian military operation inside Russia, three Tu-95MS were destroyed and one more damaged, and one An-12BT was burned in the ground at Olenya air base; three Tu-95MS destroyed and one more damaged, and four Tu-22M3 were destroyed at Belaya air base.
(Russia)	7 June	Su-35S	Shot down by Ukrainian forces and crashed in Kursk Oblast. The pilot ejected and rescued.
(Russia)	13 June	Su-25	A Su-25 crashed near Soledar, Donetsk Oblast during a combat mission. The pilot ejected and rescued. Russian sources claimed the aircraft crashed due to structural failure of the right wing, although it has also been theorized that the aircraft might be shot down by friendly fire from another Su-25.
(Russia)	14 August	Su-30SM	A Su-30SM of the Naval Aviation crashed over the sea near Snake Island under unknown circumstance. Two pilots died.
(Russia)	24 September	An-26	During a Ukrainian drone attack on Kacha air base, Crimea, a An-26 Blue 30, is destroyed in the ground.
(Russia)	25 September	Su-34	A Su-34 fighter bomber was shotdown after a bombing mission on Stepnogorsk, by Ukrainian forces likely using an MIM-104 Patriot in Vasilyevka, Zaporithzya. One crewmember died the other survived.
(Russia)	17 October	Su-30SM	A Su-30SM fighter crashed in Crimea amid a Ukrainian UAV drone attack. Two crew ejected and recovered.
(Russia)	25 November	A-60, A-100	Two Russian Beriev A planes were attacked in a Ukrainian drone attack on Taganrog-South Airfield, Rostov Oblast, Russia. A A-60, RA-86879 and a mothballed Beriev A-100LL, RF-93953 were destroyed.
(Russia)	11 December	An-26KPA	An An-26KPA, registration number RF-46873, 54 Blue, of the 318th Composite Aviation Regiment of Naval Aviation was destroyed by drones during takeoff at Kacha air base in Crimea. At least one crew member died and several were injured.
Total		26	1 A-60, 1 A-100, 2 An-26, 3 Su-25, 3 Su-30, 1 Su-35, 2 Su-34, 8 Tu-95, 4 Tu-22M, 1 An-12

===== 2026 =====
Operator	Date	Type	Description
(Russia)	31 March	An-26	A Russian An-26 was lost over Crimea during a scheduled flight with 29 crewmembers and passengers killed.
(Russia)	15 May	Be-200	A Russian Be-200, from the Naval Aviation was destroyed by a Ukrainian drone attack on Yeysk Air Base in Krasnodar Krai.
(Russia)	8 July	Su-35	A Russian Su-35 was shot down in Ukraine during a engagement with F-16s and a Patriot Missile system. The pilot survived and the wreckage of the jetfighter was recorded by Ukrainian forces.
(Russia)	17 July	Tu-95	A Tu-95 strategic bomber was destroyed in the ground in Engels-2 airport by a Ukrainian drone attack.
(Russia)	21 July	MiG-29	A Russian MiG-29 destroyed on ground in Chalino airfield base by Ukrainian LMs RAM-2X
(Russia)	28 August	Tu-95	A Russian Tu-95MS was attacked on the ground at the Engels-2 air base of Saratov region. The right wing of the bomber was damaged, satellite images confirmed the next day.
(Russia)	7 September	Su-24	A Russian Su-24 was attacked on the ground at Saky Air base, Crimea. The fighter bomber was hit and damaged or destroyed.
(Russia)	7 September	2 Su-35	Two Russian Su-35 collided over Kursk Oblast, one of the pilots was killed the other ejected and survived.
(Russia)	4 October	1 Su-34 and another unidentified	Ukrainian drones, similar in design to the Russian Geran and Shahed models, struck the Khanskaya airbase in Adygea, resulting in the destruction of one Su-34 aircraft and another unidentified fighter.
(Russia)	15 October	4 Su-34	Ukrainian Neptune missile strike destroyed four Su-34M stationed at Borisoglebsk Airbase, Voronezh Oblast. Satellite images showed two wrecks and a pair of wings destroyed at the airport.
(Russia)	29 October	2 Su-34	As a result of a Ukrainian attack using Neptune Long ballistic missiles on the Marinovka airbase near Volgograd, two Su-34 aircraft were destroyed.
Total		17	1 An-26, 1 Be-200, 1 MiG-29, 1 Su-24, 7 Su-34, 3 Su-35, 2 Tu-95, 1 unidentified

==== Rotary-wing aircraft ====
===== 2022 =====
Operator	Date	Type	Description
(Russia) (6)	24–28 February	4 Ka-52, 2 Mi-35M	Two Mi-35M registration number RF-13024, Blue 29 and RF-95290, Red 04 were shot down over Dnipro river on Kyiv. Four Ka-52 attack helicopters were downed and destroyed during the Battle of Antonov Airport. RF-90680, Blue 17 landed safely later destroyed by Russian forces. RF-91122, RF-13405 and RF-90656 were lost in Bucha Raion during the battle of Hostomel.
(Russia)	25 February	Mi-28	A Mi-28UB, RF-13668 was destroyed outside Hostomel airport.
(Russia)	26 February	Mi-35	Shot down in Sahy, Kherson Oblast. Video of the helicopter in flames and the wreck were recorded.
(Russia)	1 March	Ka-52	A Ka-52 registration number RF-90304 crash landed in Babyntsi, Kyiv Oblast. Later destroyed in the ground by Russian soldiers.
(Russia)	3 March	Mi-28	Lost in Ukraine, Maj. Sergei Emelyanchik and Maj. Igor Markelovdid killed.
(Russia) (2)	4 March	Mi-8	One Mi-8AMTV-5, RF-04525 was shot down near Volnovakha as it approached a downed Su-25, 9 of the 11 crew and passengers died. A Mi-8M, RF- 91292 shot down near Makariv, Kyiv Oblast; crew died.
(Russia) (2)	5 March	Mi-8	RF-91165 and RF-91164 destroyed near Mykolaiv.
(Russia) (2)	5 March	Mi-24, Mi-35	RF-95286 shot down and recorded in drone video. RF-13017 was shot down in Bashtanka Raion, Mykolaiv Oblast. Images displayed on social networks.
(Russia)	6 March	Mi-24P	RF-94966 shot down by Ukrainian MANPADS in Kyiv Oblast.
(Russia)	6 March	Mi-8	Mi-8 shotdown by Ukrainian forces over Dnipro river near in Nova Kakhovka, 17 crewmen killed.
(Russia)	11 March	Mi-8	A Mi-8MTV-5, RF-24764 was damaged after performing a hard landing in Valuyki, Belgorod Oblast.
(Russia)	12 March	Ka-52	RF-13409 shot down near Kherson; one crewman sustained serious injuries.
(Russia) (?)	15 March	Unspecified	Satellite images of the aftermath of a Ukrainian attack on Kherson Airport were released. Unknown number of Russian aircraft were destroyed/ damaged. However, some seem to have been destroyed previously.
(Russia)	16 March	Ka-52	A Ka-52, registration number RF-13411 was shot down by a Piorun MANPADS on found in Voznesensky Raion, Mykolaiv Oblast
(Russia)	17 March	Mi-35M	A Mi-35M attack helicopter with transport capabilities found destroyed somewhere in Ukraine.
(Russia)	30 March	Mi-8	A Mi-8, registration number RF-91882 destroyed on the ground in Kharkiv Oblast.
(Russia)	30 March	Mi-28N	The wreckage of an Mi-28N, RF-13628, was found in Elitne, Kharkiv Oblast
(Russia)	31 March	Mi-28N	A Mi-28N shot down in Holubivs'ke, Luhansk, pilot and gunner survived. According to The Times, a Starstreak MANPAD system used to shot it down. Wreck recorded in November 2023.
(Russia)	2 April	Mi-8	Remains of RF-91285 discovered in Hostomel Airport. Possibly lost during the fight for the airport in February.
(Russia)	4 April	Mi-8	A Mi-8 serial number, RF-04812 was destroyed in Ukraine, the pilot died.
(Russia)	5 April	Ka-52	A Ka-52, was shot down by a Stugna-P anti-tank guided missile.
(Russia) (2)	21 April	Mi-8, Mi-28	Shot down by Ukrainian forces using 9K38 Igla MANPADS in Zaporizhzhia Oblast.
(Russia)	15 April	Ka-52	Shot down by Ukrainian 93rd Mechanized Brigade in Izium Raion, Kharkiv Oblast. One crewmember, Vasily Kleshchenko was killed.
(Russia)	30 April	Ka-52	Shot down by a Stugna-P anti-tank guided missile.
(Russia)	8 May	Mi-8	A Mi-8AMTSh, registration number RF-91187, Blue 92, was destroyed on the ground by Ukrainian Su-27s on Snake Island.
(Russia)	9 May	Mi-28	A Mi-28, RF-13654 Red 70, was shot down in Tsyrkuny, Kharkiv Oblast .
(Russia)	14 May	Ka-52	Remains of tail number Yellow 22, was found destroyed near Hostomel, likely destroyed during the Battle of Hostomel Airport in February.
(Russia)	19 May	Ka-52	A Ka-52, registration number RF-13428 was shot down in Lyptsi, Kharkiv Oblast. Both crewmembers survived
(Russia)	4 June	Ka-52	A Ka-52 was shot down by Ukrainian 128th Mountain Brigade with a MANPAD in Popasna. Pilots Senior Lieutenant Pavel Khrebet and Lieutenant Egor Nosov were killed.
(Russia)	12 June	Mi-28H	Wreck videod by Ukrainian troops; the crew was lost.
(Russia)	16 June	Mi-24VM	A 487th Separate Helicopter Regiment Mi-24VM, Registration number RF-91410, code name Blue 30 was shot down by Ukrainian 231st Dnipropetrovsk Territorial Defense Battalion using MANPADS near Rivnopil, Volnovakha Raion.
(Russia)	27 June	Ka-52	British Martlet MANPADS hit and forced it to land.
(Russia)	28 June	Mi-8	Operated by the 6th Air Force and Air Defense Army shot down in Zaporizhzhia Oblast. All seven occupants, including Lieutenant Maxim Kozlov and Lieutenant Alexey Usov, lost.
(Russia)	30 June	Mi-8	39th Helicopter Regiment helicopter lost under unknown circumstances in the Black Sea near Snake Island.
(Russia)	12 July	Ka-52	319th Separate Helicopter Regiment helicopter lost in Kadiivka, Luhansk Oblast. Major Askar Robortdinov and Major Igor Saraev lost.
(Russia)	30 July	Ka-52	The remains of a Ka-52 were published. The helicopter was shot down by two missiles the crew survived.
(Russia)	15 August	Ka-52	Ukrainian forces damaged a Ka-52 helicopter flying in Donetsk Oblast.
(Russia)	17 September	Ka-52	Shot down in Velyka Novosilka, Donetsk Oblast.
(Russia)	22 September	Ka-52	Shot down in Zaporizhzhia Oblast by an anti-air missile. The pilots survived.
(Russia)	26 September	Mi-8	Wreck of a Mi-8 found in Henichesk, Kherson Oblast.
(Russia) (2)	1 October	Ka-52	Two Ka-52 were shot down in Zaporizhzhia Oblast, one in Remivka, pilots Captain Alexey Belonozhko and Senior Lieutenant Ilya Sevastyanov, did not survive. The other Ka-52 was shot down in Kopani, one crewmember Vasily Furmanov did not survive and the other escaped.
(Russia)	2 October	Ka-52	Remains of RF-90393, callsign Red-81 found by Ukrainian Forces in Bilyayivka, Kherson.
(Russia)	8 October	Ka-52	Remains found by the Ukrainian 128th Mountain Brigade in Kherson Oblast. Dates and circumstances unknown.
(Russia)	12 October	Ka-52	A Ka-52 was lost near Sukhanove, Beryslav Raion, Kherson Oblast. Crew members Major Maxim Kovalev and Senior Lieutenant Andrei Butorin died.
(Russia)	30 October	Mi-24	Remains found in Kharkiv,.
(Russia) (2)	31 October	Ka-52	Two Ka-52 were damaged at Pskov Airport, likely by Ukrainian saboteurs.
	31 October	Mi-8 MTKO	A Mi-8MTKO registration number RF-93526, Yellow 72, operated by the Wagner Group, shot down with MANPAD by Ukrainian forces near Spirne, Donetsk Oblast.
(Russia) (2)	13 November	Mi-8, Mi-24	Previously captured at Kherson Airport; recaptured by Ukrainian forces.
(Russia)	18 November	Ka-52	Remains found in Kherson.
(Russia)	4 December	Ka-52	Shot down by Ukrainian Dnipro anti-aircraft missile brigade, killing both pilots.
(Russia)	20 December	Ka-52	RF-91335, callsign Yellow 43 was shot down, reportedly by a Pantsir-S1 in a friendly fire incident in Zaporizhzhia Oblast. The pilots likely survived.
Total		59	14 Mi-8, 9 Mi-24/35, 7 Mi-28, 29 Ka-52.

===== 2023 =====
Operator	Date	Type	Description
(Russia)	7 February	Mi-24VM	An Mi-24VM, registration number RF-13010, codename Yellow 17 was damaged and subsequently destroyed in the ground by Ukrainian forces in Tkarivka, Kharkiv Oblast.
(Russia)	16 March	Ka-52	A Ka-52 crashed in Orikhiv Raion, Zaporizhzhia Oblast, reportedly after hitting power lines. At least one crew member died.
(Russia)	5 April	Mi-24	An Mi-24 was shot down near Berestove in Donetsk Oblast by the Ukrainian Army 10th Separate Mountain Assault Brigade. The loss was confirmed by one of the prominent pro-Russian Telegram channels. One of the crew members who died was Ilnaz Fazylov of the 112th Separate Helicopter Regiment.
(Russia)	10 April	Ka-52	A Ka-52 was shot down in the Avdiivka direction.
(Russia)	20 April	Mi-35M	A Mil Mi-35M crashed on Azov Sea, near Kyrylivka Zaporizhzhia Oblast. Two crewmen died.
(Russia)	24 April	Mi-24VM	A Mil Mi-24VM crashed near Kupiansk reportedly after hitting power lines.
(Russia)	12 May	Mi-28	An Mi-28NM, crashed in Svitle,Dzhankoi, Crimea. Both pilots died, with the preliminary cause described as a technical failure. The helicopter was not equipped with a combat load at the time of the crash.
(Russia) (2)	13 May	Mi-8	Two Mil Mi-8 helicopters crashed in Bryansk Oblast, near the Ukrainian border. Russian newspaper Kommersant reported they were shot down.
(Russia)	22 May	Ka-52	A Ka-52 was lost under unclear circumstances in Belgorod Oblast.
(Russia)	19 June	Ka-52	A Ka-52 was recorded flying home, despite being damaged with the loss of its tail. The aircraft design of coaxial rotor blades, allowed the helicopter to fly without the tail.
(Russia)	23 June	Mi-8MTPR	An Mi-8MTPR was shot down by enemy fire in Luhansk Oblast, of the crew of four only the commander ejected.
(Russia) (6)	24 June	4 Mi-8,1 Mi-35, 1 Ka-52	Four Mi-8s, including two Mi-8MTPR EW helicopters, one Mi-35 and one Ka-52 attack helicopter, registration number RF-13418, were shot down by the Wagner Group in Russia during the Wagner Group rebellion according to Russian sources.
(Russia)	30 June	Unknown	The debris of an unknown helicopter was recorded in Melitopol. The airframe was likely lost time before during the takeover of the airport.
(Russia)	25 July	Ka-52	A Ka-52 was shot down in Donetsk Oblast. Both crew members died according to Russian sources.
(Russia)	7 August	Ka-52	A Ka-52 was shot down in Robotyne, Zaporizhzhia Oblast. The loss was acknowledged by a Russian Telegram Helicopter pilot group.
(Russia)	9 August	Mi-8	During a Ukrainian intelligence operation, Maxim Kuzminov a Russian pilot defected to Ukraine while manning a Mi-8AMTSh, serial number RF-04428, codename Red 62 on Ukrainian territory. two other crewmen were killed by Ukrainian forces after landing in a Ukrainian airfield. In February 2014, Kuzminov was found killed in Spain.
(Russia)	17 August	Ka-52	A Ka-52 was shot down near Novoprokopivka, Zaporizhzhia Oblast, by soldiers of the Ukrainian 47th Mechanized Brigade. Pilot ejected, navigator died.
(Russia)	1 September	Ka-52	A Ka-52 crashed in the Sea of Azov. The crew survived and was rescued.
(Russia) (18)	17 October	10 Ka-52, 8 Mi-8	Ukrainian forces struck Berdiansk and Luhansk airfields with six ATACMS missiles, leaving two Mi-8s and six Ka-52s destroyed, two Mi-8s and three Ka-52s damaged beyond repair and four Mi-8s and one Ka-52 damaged, according to satellite photos.
(Russia)	22 October	Mi-8MTV-5	A Russian Naval Aviation Mil Mi-8MTV-5 was shot down by friendly fire and crashed at sea. 3 crew died.
Total		42	17 Mi-8, 6 Mi-24/35, 1 Mi-28, 19 Ka-52, 1 unidentified

===== 2024 =====
Operator	Date	Type	Description
(Russia)	10 April	Mi-24	An Mi-24VP registration number RF-34200, callsign 39 Red, crashed into the sea during a combat mission in the Black Sea, the Russian MOD reported.
(Russia)	21 June	Ka-29	A Ka-29 was shot down by friendly fire in Anapa, Krasnodar.
(Russia)	25 July	Mi-28	An Mi-28 crashed after it was hit by a drone explosion in Klenki, Kaluga region Russia, both pilots died.
National Guard of the Russian Federation	31 July	Mi-8	An Mi-8MTV-2, RF-34255, Yellow 59, from Rosgvardiya, was destroyed on the ground by Ukrainian MGM-140 ATACMS fire, 20 passengers and crewmen were killed.
(Russia)	6 August	Ka-52	An Ka-52 was shotdown by Ukrainian forces in Kursk Oblast.
(Russia)	10 August	Ka-52	A Ka-52 was shotdown by Ukrainian forces using MANPADS in Kursk oblast, Russia.
(Russia)	25 August	Mi-8	An Mi-8 was damaged after sustaining heavy fire by Ukrainian forces and crash landed in Kursk Oblast.
(Russia)	21 September	Mi-8AMTSh	An Mi-8AMTSh Yellow 05 suffered fire damage that destroyed the cockpit after an arson attack at Omsk-Severnyy air base, Omsk Oblast.
(Russia)	26 October	Mi-28	An Mi-28 suffered mechanical failures and crashed in Kerch Strait. Two crew members were killed.
(Russia)	7 November	Ka-52	A Ka-52 crashed in an unknown location, one crew member was killed while another one ejected and injured according to Telegram channel Fighterbomber.
(Russia)	18 December	Ka-52	A Ka-52 was shot down by friendly fire in an unknown location during combat sortie. Two crew members were killed.
(Russia)	31 December	Mi-8	An Mi-8 was shot down by an R-73 missile fired from Ukrainian MAGURA V5 USV in the Black Sea near Cape Tarkhankut, Crimea.
Total		12	4 Mi-8, 1 Mi-24, 2 Mi-28, 1 Ka-29, 4 Ka-52

===== 2025 =====
Operator	Date	Type	Description
(Russia)	1 January	Mi-28	An Mi-28 crashed in Kamensky District, Voronezh Oblast, both pilots died.
(Russia) (4)	23 March	1 Mi-8, 1 Mi-28, 2 Ka-52	One Mi-8MTV-5, bort number 54 Red, and one Mi-28N, bort number 96 Red, were severely damaged and two Ka-52 were damaged by HIMARS barrages at a helicopter forward operating base in Ivnyansky District, Belgorod Oblast. Russian sources indicated that one Ka-52 was repairable.
(Russia)	23 May	Mi-8	An Mi-8 crashed in Uritsky District, Oryol Oblast, three crew died.
(Russia) (2)	28 June	1 Mi-8, 1 Mi-26	One Mi-8 was destroyed and a Mi-26 was likely damaged beyond repair by a Ukrainian drone strike at Kirovske Air Base in Crimea.
(Russia) (2)	30 August	2 Mi-8	Two Mi-8 were destroyed by a Ukrainian drone strike at Gvardeyskoye Air Base in Crimea.
(Russia)	21 September	Mi-8	One Mi-8 was destroyed by a Ukrainian drone strike at an unidentified air base in Crimea.
(Russia)	29 September	Mi-8	One Mi-8MTV-5, registration number RF-91147, on a combat search and rescue-CSAR mission was hit by a Ukrainian FPV drone and crash-landed near Nadaeyvka, Pokrovsk. There were 2 survivors the pilot and other 7 crewmen died.
(Russia)	27 October	Ka-52	One Ka-52 was lost in Ukraine in undisclosed circumstances.
Total		13	7 Mi-8, 1 Mi-26, 2 Mi-28, 3 Ka-52

===== 2026 =====
Operator	Date	Type	Description
(Russia)	3 March	Mi-8	A Russian Mi-8AMTSh helicopter was destroyed amid a Ukrainian drone attack or an friendly fire episode by a Russian jetfighter on Rostov Oblast. The crew of three was killed.
(Russia)	5 March	Ka-27	A Russian Naval Aviation Kamov Ka-27PS (Helix-D) was destroyed by a Ukrainian drone attack when it landed over Syvash Drilling Platform in the Black Sea. The crew survived.
(Russia)	20 March	Ka-52	A Russian Kamov Ka-52 combat helicopter was shot down by a Ukrainian FPV drone in Pokrovsky, Donetsk. The crew of two was killed by FPV drones.
(Russia)	29 April	Mi-8 and Mi-28	Ukrainian forces launched FPV drones attacks on Russian helicopter grounded at a forward base in Voronezh Oblast, Russia. One Mi-8 and Mi-28 were damaged.
(Russia)	4 September	2 helicopters	Ukrainian forces launched drone attacks on Sochi airbase, Russia. Destroying two helicopters.
(Russia)	1 October	Mi-8	A Russian Mi-8 crashed in Anna, possibly shot down by friendly fire from a Su-35.
(Russia)	30 October	Mi-8	Ukrainian forces launched a drone attack on a Russian Mi-8 stationed at the airbase in Tarasivka, Luhansk Oblast.
Total		9	4 Mi-8, 1 Mi-28, 1 Ka-27, 1 Ka-52, 2 unidentified

==== Unmanned combat aerial vehicle (UCAV) ====
===== 2022 =====
Operator	Date	Type	Description
(Russia)	11 March	Forpost	A Forpost drone was shot down in Zhytomyr.
(Russia)	7 April	Orion - I	An Orion drone was reported destroyed in Ukraine. The Ukrainian MOD released images of the drone wreck.
(Russia)	25 April	Orion - I	The remains of an Orion UAV was found in Ukraine.
(Russia)	25 June	Orion - I	An Orion UAV crashed into a tree in the streets of Mariupol.
(Russia)	4 July	Forpost	A Forpost drone crashed into a house in Taganrog, Rostov Oblast.
(Russia)	21 July	Orion - I	The remains of an Orion drone were found in Ukraine.
(Russia)	30 July	Forpost	The remains of a Forpost drone, registration number 932, were recorded in Bulgaria.
(Russia)	23 September	Mohajer-6	An Iranian-made Mohajer 6, presumably operated by Russian forces, was brought down by Ukrainian forces in the Black Sea near Odesa. The drone was in relatively intact condition and was captured by the Ukrainian forces.
(Russia)	9 November	Korsar	A Korsar drone was recorded crashed in Ukraine.
Total		9	3 Forpost, 1 Korsar, 1 Mohajer-6, 4 Orion

===== 2023 =====
Operator	Date	Type	Description
(Russia)	11 January	Forpost	A Forpost hit electric power lines and crashed near Severny, Belgorod Oblast.
(Russia)	15 May	Orion - I	The remains of an Orion drone were recorded in Kherson.
(Russia)	6 June	Mohajer-6	The remains of a Mohajer-6 drone, supplied by Iran, were recorded in eastern Crimea. The drone was jammed by friendly EW warfare, according to Russian sources.
(Russia)	31 July	Forpost	A Forpost drone crashed in Taganrog, Rostov Oblast.
Total		4	2 Forpost, 1 Mohajer-6, 1 Orion

===== 2024 =====
Operator	Date	Type	Description
(Russia)	26 May	Mohajer-6	A crashed Mohajer-6 drone number ER-858 was recorded in Kursk Oblast.
(Russia)	24 September	Orion - I	An Orion drone crashed into industrial area in Taganrog, Rostov Oblast during landing at Taganrog-Central air base.
(Russia)	5 October	S-70	An S-70 Okhotnik-B UCAV, call sign Red 074, shot down by deliberate friendly fire from a Su-57 after losing contact with ground control and approaching the Ukrainian border. The drone crashed near Kostiantynivka, Ukraine.
(Russia)	20 October	Orion - I	An Orion drone was shot down by 9K35 Strela-10 surface-to-air missile system of the 80th Air Assault Brigade in Kursk Oblast.
Total		4	1 S-70, 2 Orion, 1 Mohajer-6

===== 2025 =====
Operator	Date	Type	Description
(Russia)	20 April	Forpost-R	A Forpost-R drone was damaged by a Ukrainian FPV interceptor drone of the 414th Unmanned Strike Aviation Brigade. The drone managed to escape into Russian-held territory. A Russian source claimed that the drone managed to landed safely.
(Russia)	13 September	Orion - I	An Orion - I drone was shot down by a Ukrainian FPV interceptor drone of the 414th Unmanned Strike Aviation Brigade over Kursk Oblast.
Total		2	1 Forpost, 1 Orion

===== 2026 =====
Operator	Date	Type	Description
(Russia)	26 June	Orion - I	An Orion - I drone was destroyed on the ground durinshot down by a Ukrainian FPV interceptor drone of the 414th Unmanned Strike Aviation Brigade over Kursk Oblast.
Total		1	1 Orion

=== Other operators ===
Operator	Date	Type	Description
(Hungary) Hungarian civilian aircraft	27 February 2022	Cessna 152	A Cessna 152 with registration HA-WAS stored in the Antonov An-225 hangar at Hostomel Airport was crushed by the left wing of the destroyed Antonov An-225.
(3) Azerbaijan Air Force	28 February 2022	MiG-29	Three MiG-29s being refitted in the Lviv State Aircraft Plant were reported destroyed or damaged on the ground by Russian strikes.
(2) Romanian Air Force	2 March 2022	MiG-21 Lancer, IAR 330	A MiG-21 Lancer was lost while on an air patrol inside Romanian airspace near Cogealac, 60 miles from the Ukrainian border. This "occurred amid increased air police missions in Romania after the Russian invasion of Ukraine." An IAR 330 on a search and rescue mission for the missing MiG-21 crashed with seven fatalities. The eight servicemen who died in the two accidents were posthumously promoted and decorated by the president of Romania.
San Marino civilian aircraft	10 April 2022	Gulfstream G150	Registration T7-DSD was destroyed by Russian strike while stored in a hangar at Dnipro International Airport. The G150 was registered in San Marino and owned by AC Terra International (registered in the British Virgin Islands) for businessman Vadym Vladimirovich Yermolaiev.
Belarusian Air Force	11 July 2022	Chekan	Ukrainian forces shot down a Belarusian Chekan loitering munition.
United States Air Force	14 March 2023	MQ-9 Reaper	A US MQ-9 Reaper UCAV was lost over the Black Sea after it was intercepted by two Russian Su-27s, one of which intentionally downed the drone by striking its propeller.
Transnistria military aircraft	17 March 2024	Mil Mi-8	A stored Mil Mi-8 helicopter of the forces of Transnistria was destroyed on the ground by a suicide drone in Tiraspol airport.
United States Air Force	4 June 2024	Northrop Grumman RQ-4 Global Hawk	A US RQ-4 ISR drone was reported missing over the Black Sea. Russian officials declined to comment on the event.
(4) United States civilian aircraft	27 April 2025	PZL-110 Koliber, Piper PA-28 Cherokee, Piper PA-32 Cherokee Six, Beechcraft Baron	A PZL-Okecie PZL-110 Koliber 150A N150AQ, Piper PA-28-235 Cherokee Pathfinder N56937, and a Piper PA-32 Cherokee Six N56131, all owned by Qualitair LLC, that were stored at a hangar in Zhytomyr Airport were damaged beyond repair due to a Russian drone strike at the airport. In addition, a Beechcraft 58P Baron N333RF owned by the same owner was heavily damaged.
(Denmark) Danish civilian aircraft	27 April 2025	Cessna 172	A Cessna 172M with registration OY-JPC stored at a hangar in Zhytomyr Airport received minor damage due to a Russian drone strike at the airport.

=== Total losses ===
The following table tallies the data above.

Aircraft losses
Airframe	Ukraine	Russia	Others
Aero L-39 Albatros	16 (1 damaged)	—	
F-16 Fighting Falcon	5	—	
Mikoyan-Gurevich MiG-21	4 (2 damaged)	—	1 Romania
Mikoyan MiG-29	57 (4 damaged)	2	3 Azerbaijan
Mikoyan MiG-31	—	3	
Mirage 2000	1	—	
Sukhoi Su-24	27 (1 damaged)	15 (5 damaged)	
Sukhoi Su-25	28 (2 damaged)	38 (5 damaged)	
Sukhoi Su-27	31 (12 damaged)	4 (1 damaged)	
Sukhoi Su-30	—	15 (1 damaged)	
Sukhoi Su-33	—	1	
Sukhoi Su-34	—	38 (5 damaged)	
Sukhoi Su-35	—	10	
Sukhoi Su-57	—	1 (damaged)	—
Ilyushin Il-22M	—	2 (1 damaged)	
Ilyushin Il-76	4 (1 captured)	5 (2 damaged)	
Antonov An-12	3	1	
Antonov An-22	1 (damaged)	—	
Antonov An-26	9	4	
Antonov An-28	2	—	
Antonov An-72	1		
Antonov An-74	2		
Antonov An-124	1 (damaged)	—	
Antonov/Taqnia An-132	1		
Antonov An-140	1 (damaged)		
Antonov An-148	1 (damaged)		
Antonov An-225	1	—	
Airbus A320	1		
Airbus A321	2		
ATR 72	2		
Aeroprakt A-22	11 (1 damaged)	—	
Aeroprakt A-32	1 (damaged)	—	
Aeros Skyranger	5 (1 damaged)	—	
Beriev A-50	—	2	
Beriev A-60	—	1	
Beriev A-100	—	1	
Beriev Be-200	—	2 (damaged)	
Gulfstream G100/G150			1 San Marino
Airbus Helicopters H225	1	—	
Mil Mi-2	6 (3 captured)	—	
Mil Mi-8/Mil Mi-17	52 (3 damaged)	46 (9 damaged, 3 captured)	1 Transnistria
Mil Mi-14	1	—	
Mil Mi-24/35	22 (4 damaged)	17 (1 captured)	
Mil Mi-26	—	1	—
Mil Mi-28	—	12	
Ka-27/29	—	2	
Kamov Ka-52	—	56 (12 damaged)	
IAR 330	—	—	1 Romania
Westland Sea King	1 (damaged)	—	
Beechcraft Baron			1 United States (damaged)
Cessna 152			1 Hungary
Cessna 172	4 (2 damaged)		1 Denmark (damaged)
Extra EA-300	1		
Flight Design CT	1		
KhaZ-30	1		
Mooney M20	1 (damaged)		
NARP-1	1	—	—
Piper PA-28 Cherokee			1 United States
Piper PA-32 Cherokee Six			1 United States
Pipistrel Virus	1		
PZL-110 Koliber			1 United States
Sukhoi Su-31	1		
Tecnam P2002 Sierra	1		
Tupolev Tu-22M	—	7 (1 damaged)	
Tupolev Tu-95	—	10 (3 damaged)	
Yakovlev Yak-52	1	—	
Unknown helicopter	2	3	—
Unknown fixed wing aircraft	9 (5 damaged)	2	
Total aircraft	341	296	13

Combat drones losses
Airframe	Ukraine	Russia	Others
Baykar Bayraktar TB2	30	—	
Chekan UAV	—	—	1 Belarus
Forpost	—	6 (1 damaged)	
General Atomics MQ-9 Reaper	—	—	1 United States
Kronshtadt Orion	—	16	
Luch Korsar	—	1	
Qods Mohajer-6	—	3	
RQ-4 Global Hawk	—	—	1 United States
Sukhoi S-70 Okhotnik-B	—	1	—
Tupolev Tu-141	9	—	
Tupolev Tu-143	7	—	
UJ-22 Airborne	5	—	
UJ-25 Skyline	1	—	
Total aircraft	52	27	3

== See also ==
- Aerial warfare in the Russian invasion of Ukraine
- Weapons of the Russo-Ukrainian War
- List of ship losses during the Russo-Ukrainian War
- Ukrainian Air Force § Aircraft
- Russian Air Force Aircraft
- Malaysia Airlines Flight 17
- Azerbaijan Airlines Flight 8243
- 2023 Wagner Group plane crash
