= Fedorivka =

Several places in Ukraine

Fedorivka (Ukrainian: Федорівка) may refer to several places in Ukraine:

- Fedorivka, Novoukrainka Raion, Kirovohrad Oblast
- Fedorivka, Luhansk Oblast
- Fedorivka, Vinnytsia Raion, Vinnytsia Oblast
- Fedorivka, Zhmerynka Raion, Vinnytsia Oblast
- Fedorivka, Bakhmut Raion, Donetsk Oblast
- Fedorivka, Polohy Raion, Zaporizhzhia Oblast
