= 11th Army Aviation Brigade =

Ukrainian Ground Forces formation

- Active: 1992
- Country: Ukraine
- Allegiance: Armed Forces of Ukraine
- Branch: Ukrainian Ground Forces
- Type: Brigade
- Role: Army aviation
- Part of: Operational Command South
- Garrison/HQ: Chornobaivka airfield
- Nickname: Kherson
- Engagements: War in Abkhazia; MONUSCO; Russo-Ukrainian war: War in Donbass; February 2015 Kramatorsk rocket attack; Russian invasion of Ukraine; Northern Ukraine campaign; Southern Ukraine campaign; Snake Island campaign
- Decorations: For Courage and Bravery

Commanders
- Current Commander: Colonel Minakov Ruslan Viktorovych

Aircraft flown
- Attack: Mi-24
- Patrol: Yak-52, An-28
- Transport: Mi-8, Mi-2

The 11th Separate Army Aviation Brigade Kherson (MUN A1604, MM B4067) is an army aviation formation of the Ukrainian Ground Forces. The brigade is directly subordinated to the Ukrainian Ground Forces command and operates a variety of rotor wing aircraft.

== History ==
On 12 January 1992, after the Dissolution of the Soviet Union, the 320th Separate Helicopter Regiment swore an oath of allegiance to Ukraine. During the war in Abkhazia, the unit's personnel and helicopters, along with other air units, participated in the Ukrainian Humanitarian Mission in Georgia from 8 to 26 October 1993 evacuating more than 2,000 Georgian civilians from the Kodori Valley, two helicopters of the brigade were damaged by shelling and firing during the evacuation process. In 1994, the unit, together with several other military units became the 2nd Army Aviation Brigade of the Odessa Military District. On 20 August 2003, it became the 11th Aviation Regiment within the 79th Airmobile Brigade and was again expanded to a brigade in 2013. Since 2012, units of the brigade have been performing operations as part of MONUSCO in the DRC.

With the beginning of the War in Donbass, units of the brigade were involved in reinforcing Ukrainian troops on the administrative border with Crimea. On 13 June 2014, an Mi-8 helicopter of the brigade received the task of evacuating the wounded from the area of the city of Amvrosiivka flying across about 20 km over the territory controlled by separatists, where another helicopter of the 11th brigade was attacked by separatists, a day prior. So, they had to fly at low altitude to protect the aircraft from missiles. Suddenly, the helicopter was attacked with small arms killing Captain Andriy Pavlovych Tykholoz, of the brigade on spot. On 11 July 2014, Captain Oleksandr Mykhailovych Melenchuk was killed while on a combat helicopter flight. On 7 August 2014, an Mi-8MT medical helicopter of the brigade was attacked near Savur-Mohyla, Captain Dmitry Artsylenko was wounded in the head by a sniper bullet. The separatists fired from two positions with large-caliber machine guns, the two gunners from the helicopter responded with fire. On 12 August, Artsylenko Dmytro Yuriyovych died in a hospital in Dnipropetrovsk from his injuries. On 10 February 2015, a soldier of the brigade Devyatkin Viktor Viktorovich was killed in the February 2015 Kramatorsk rocket attack. On 18 March 2015, 168 fighters of the brigade were withdrawn from the ATO zone, the brigade suffered three direct in-combat fatalities during the period of its deployment in the ATO.

On 1 December 2018, the brigade received a repaired Mi-8 MT. On 14 October 2019, the brigade was awarded the honorary name "Kherson".

Following the Russian invasion of Ukraine, the brigade performed combat operations on the frontlines. The brigade's headquarters were attacked in the first hours on the Russian invasion. The brigade's home airbase, Chornobaivka was overrun by Russian forces on 27 February 2022 capturing three Mi-2s, two Mi-9s, one Mi-8 and eight Mi-24s, which were placed in storage, all operational aircraft were evacuated to other airfields. On 4 March 2022, a medevac helicopter of the brigade was shot down by a missile near Velyka Novosilka killing its pilot, Captain Pentela Yuriy Dmytrovych. On 8 March 2022, a helicopter of the brigade while flying on a combat mission was shot down with MANPADS near Brovary killing its pilot Hegechkori Oleg Irodiyovych. Another helicopter of the brigade was shot down on March 8 in the Chernihiv Oblast, two pilots were captured and later exchanged. On 15 March 2022, while performing a combat mission near Marinka in the Donetsk region, an Mi-24 of the brigade destroyed 15 pieces of Russian equipment and killed 40 soldiers, after which its plane was shot down by a missile killing pilot Borys Oleksandr Oleksandrovych and a soldier Lazovskyi Oleksandr Serhiyovych. On 18 January 2024, the brigade received large UAVs. On 13 February 2024, an Mi-8 of the brigade was attacked in the airspace near the village of Robotyne killing its pilot, Captain Ivantsov Vsevolod Pavlovich.

On 23 February 2026 the unit was awarded the Presidential Award For Courage and Bravery by the President of Ukraine Volodymyr Zelenskyy.

== Structure ==
The structure of the brigade is as follows:

11th Army Aviation Brigade

- 1st Squadron
- 2nd Squadron

== Commanders ==
- Colonel Korolev Boris Anatolyevich
- Colonel Kramarenko Valentyn Ivanovych
- Colonel Ivashchenko Yuriy Mykhailovych
- Colonel Chup Vasyl Vasilyovych
- Colonel Shlyukharchuk Taras Volodymyrovych
- Colonel Samilenko Maksym Mykhailovych
- Colonel Minakov Ruslan Viktorovych

== Sources ==
- Чорнобаївська вертолітна частина
- Структура Сухопутних військ ЗС України
