= 18th Army Aviation Brigade =

Ukrainian Ground Forces formation

- Active: 2015–present
- Country: Ukraine
- Allegiance: Armed Forces of Ukraine
- Branch: Ukrainian Ground Forces
- Type: Brigade
- Role: Army aviation
- Part of: Ground Forces Command
- Garrison/HQ: Poltava Air Base
- Nickname: Igor Sikorsky
- Patron: Igor Sikorsky
- Mottos: Will and Faith
- Engagements: MONUSCO: Russo-Ukrainian war; War in Donbass; Russian invasion of Ukraine; Eastern Ukraine campaign; Siege of Mariupol; Battle of Kramatorsk; Southern Ukraine campaign; Battle of Mykolaiv
- Decorations: For Courage and Bravery

Commanders
- Current Commander: Colonel Vitaliy Panasyuk

Insignia
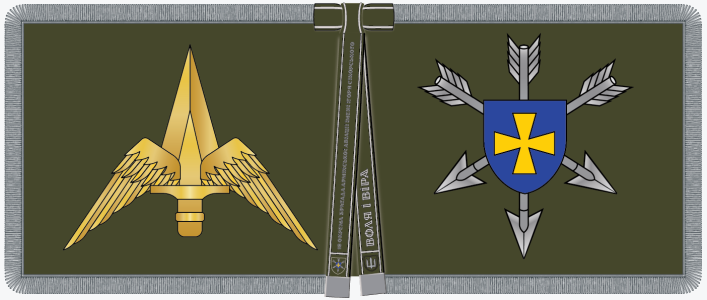
- Flag

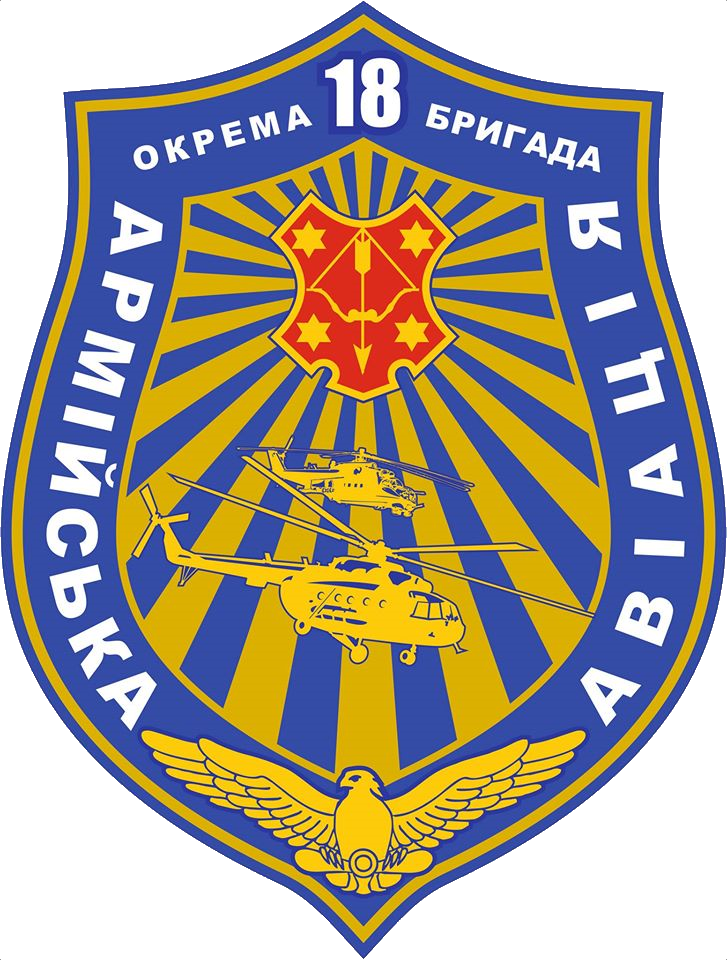
- Former Insignia

Aircraft flown
- Attack: Mi-24
- Multirole helicopter: Mi-8
- Transport: Mi-2

The 18th Army Aviation Brigade named after Igor Sikorsky (MUN A3384) is an army aviation formation of the Ukrainian Ground Forces. The brigade is directly subordinated to the Ukrainian Ground Forces command and operates a variety of rotor wing aircraft.

== History ==
The 18th Army Aviation Brigade was established in February 2015 but became operational on 1 October 2015, when the first Mi-8MSB-V was inducted into the brigade. It was established on the basis of the 215th Aviation Command, a reserve airfield for the 831st Tactical Aviation Brigade.

On 26 March 2017, an Mi-2 helicopter of the brigade crashed near Kramatorsk. There were three crew members and two passengers on board. According to preliminary findings, the helicopter, flying at low altitude, got caught on power lines and crashed. Three crew members, Lieutenant Colonel Voloshyn Yevgeny Petrovych, Captain Movchan Dmytro Vasyliovych and Senior Lieutenant Kandul Roman Grigorovich and two passenger officers of the Armed Forces of Ukraine, Colonels Valeriy Melnyk and Viktor Kalytych were killed in the crash.

On 20 March 2019, the brigade received a new Mi-2MSB helicopter at the military airfield in Starokostyantyniv.

On December 5, 2020, the brigade was awarded the honorary title named after Igor Sikorsky.

It saw heavy combat during the Russian invasion of Ukraine. On 6 March 2022, the brigade played a significant part the destruction of a Russian column near the city of Bashtanka, which aimed to break through the defenses and capture the city of Kryvyi Rih, during the last mission, the helicopters were subjected to massive rocket attacks and machine gun fire. Two helicopters of the brigade were shot down killing six personnel including Gorban Vladyslav Vyacheslavovich, Zebnytskyi Kostyantyn Mykolayovych, Chuiko Oleksandr Oleksandrovych, Turevich Igor Igorovych, Bondarenko Serhiy Mykolayovych and Pazych Ihor Ivanovych. The brigade's helicopters also took part in the evacuation of wounded and resupplying of besieged personnel during the Siege of Mariupol. On 16 March 2022, near Adamivka, an Mi-8MT helicopter of the brigade was shot down by Russian forces while performing a combat mission killing Captain Meheda Serhiy Oleksandrovych. On 29 August 2023, an Mi-8 military helicopter of the brigade crashed in Kramatorsk killing six personnel whose identities and circumstances of the crash were not officially disclosed, however Captain Anisimov Yuri Mikhailovich was reported to have been amongst those killed.

On 12 December 2025 the unit was awarded the Presidential Award For Courage and Bravery by the President of Ukraine Volodymyr Zelenskyy.

== Structure ==
- 18th Army Aviation Brigade, Poltava Air Base (formed 2015)
  - 1st Squadron (Mi-2)
  - 2nd Squadron (Mi-8)
  - 3rd Squadron (Mi-24)
  - 18th Separate Helicopter Detachment supported MONUSCO, until 2022

== Commanders ==
- Colonel Pozhydayev Sergey Nikolaevich (2015-?)
- Colonel Panasyuk Vitaliy Valentynovich (?-)
