= Air Urga =

Ukrainian airline

Air URGA

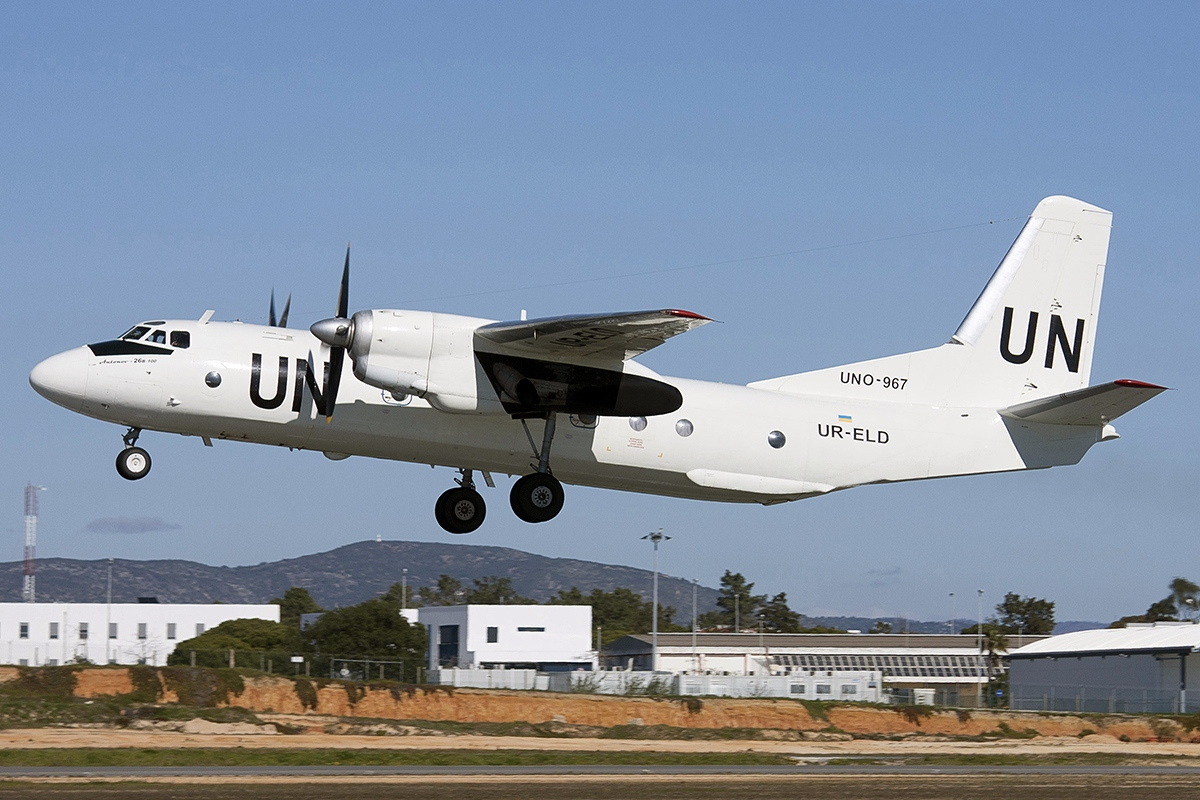
- Air Urga Antonov An-26 operated on behalf of the United Nations
IATA	ICAO	Call sign
3N	URG	URGA
- Founded: 21 August 1993
- Fleet size: 7
- Headquarters: Kropyvnytskyi, Kirovohrad Oblast, Ukraine
- Key people: Andriy Kolisnichenko (CEO)
- Operating income: ▼ ₴244,023,953 (2025)
- Profit: ▼ ₴-34,809,000 (2025)
- Total assets: ▼ ₴281,046,000 (2025)
- Total equity: ▼ ₴174,204,000 (2025)
- Employees: 176 (2025)
- Website: www.urga.aero

URGA International Joint Stock Aviation Company (Ukrainian: Міжнародна акціонерна авіаційна компанія «УРГА»), branded as Air Urga, is a charter airline based in Kropyvnytskyi and Zhuliany, Ukraine.

== History ==
The airline was established and started operations in August 1993. It was founded as International Joint Stock Aviation Company URGA, initially concentrating on charter flights. Regular passenger flights from Kyiv and Kryvyi Rih were added in May 1997. Air Urga is owned by the State Property Fund of Ukraine (51%) and American International Consulting Corp (43.5%). It has 378 employees.

In 2007, a scandal broke out between shareholders, namely with the State Property Fund of Ukraine and American International Consulting Corp. The SPFU accused the company of attempting to dilute the state share in the company, while the investors stated that the state was hindering the operations of the airline, through refusing to approve a financial plan for the enterprise, and approval for the purchase of ATR 42 aircraft. As a result of the dispute, AICC blocked shareholder meetings, while the SPFU responded by ordering government inspections on the company.

In 2009, the State Property Fund of Ukraine announced the sale of its 51% stake in Air Urga to the American International Consulting Corp, for a price of 13.744 million UAH. The airline reported that the further development of the airlines fleet was necessary, due to the aging condition of its fleet of Soviet-era aircraft. Air Urga CEO Leonid Shmaevich stated that fleet development was necessary in order to continue its primary contracts for the United Nations. As a result of the sale, AICC now possessed a 94.5% share in the company, while the Greek Lyktos Group retained a 5.5% share.

In 2011, it was reported that the airline had been considering the purchase or lease of new aircraft. The purchase of new aircraft was considered expedient, due to the aging condition of its Soviet era fleet, and the refusal of some European airports to permit the aircraft, citing environmental and safety concerns. Initially, the purchase of four Fokker 50 turboprop airliners were considered, but later dismissed as it was determined that operational costs would be two times greater than with the existing fleet of Antonov turboprop aircraft. The purchase of two Antonov An-158 regional jet aircraft were also considered, but also dismissed as economically non-viable. By late July, the airline was reported to be negotiating the purchase or leasing of Swedish Saab 340 turboprop aircraft.

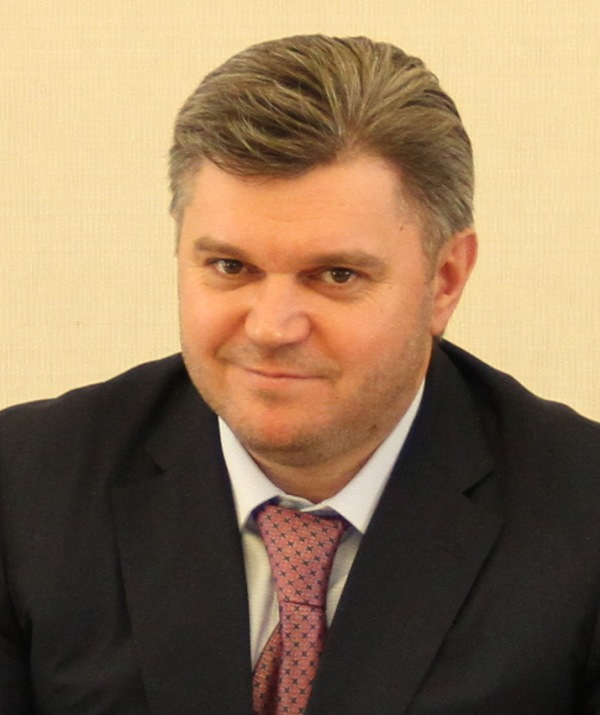
Eduard Stavytsky

In 2013, 94.5% of the companies shares were transferred to the holding company Sirius 2013 LLC. In May 2014, a letter was published by Miltiadis Apostolou, president of the Lyktos Group of companies, alleging that the company had been the subject of a hostile takeover from Eduard Stavytsky, a Ukrainian politician and government official who held several ministerial portfolios in the Azarov Government under President Viktor Yanukovych. The letter claims that following privatisation, a supervisory board was set up consisting of Stavytskyi’s father Anatoliy, his mother-in-law Valentyna Ushakova, and Liudmyla Makhlai, described as the Stavytskyi family’s accountant. It was reported that in 2013 the company had been transferred to Igor Ivanchenko, a close associate of Stavytsky, while ignoring the interests of the minory shareholders. Apostolou accussed Stavytsky of systematically destroying the company, through reductions in staff.

Earlier in the year, in the wake of the Maidan Revolution and several subsequent criminal investigations, Stavytsky had been placed on a wanted list of the General Prosecutor of Ukraine, and was sanctioned by the European Union. Stavytsky was assumed to have fled to Israel, living under the assumed name of Nathan Rosenberg.

In June 2014, it was reported that the airline operated 21 aircraft, including nine Saab 340, five An-26B, five An-26B-100, one An-24RV and one Cessna 172. CEO Aleksandr Galinsky reported that the airline was planning to acquire additional Saab 340 and Bombardier CRJ-200 formerly operated by UTair-Ukraine. The airline operated scheduled domestic flights between Kyiv and Lviv, as well as charter flights throughout Europe and the Middle East.

As of May 2017, the number of destinations that the company can fly to has been significantly reduced due to being put on the EU's air safety blacklist along with 180 other airlines. URGA will be unable to fly to EU destinations until these safety issues are addressed. However, as of May 2017, the airline was not operating any regular passenger flights.

== Destinations ==
Air Urga operates charter passenger and cargo flights from various Ukrainian airports to destinations in North Macedonia, Turkey, Syria, and United Arab Emirates. Its main base is the Kropyvnytskyi Airport (KGO).

== Fleet ==
=== Current fleet ===
As of October 2026, Air Urga operates the following aircraft:

Air Urga fleet
Aircraft	In service	Orders	Passengers		Notes
			Y	Total	
Antonov An-26B-100	3	—	36	36	Equipped for civil cargo operations with uprated AI-24VT engines, cargo doors and ramps.
Saab 340B	4	—	34	34	
Total	7	0			

=== Former fleet ===
The airline formerly operated additional Antonov An-26 and Saab 340 aircraft, as well as an additional Cessna 172 aircraft for training purposes.

== Incidents and accidents ==
- On 19 March 2000, an Antonov An-26 UR-26586 operating a United Nations flight crashed while landing at Goma International Airport in the Democratic Republic of the Congo. The aircraft had encountered windshear and attempted a go-around, but slammed into the runway with its landing gear raised. The 10 crew and passengers of the aircraft were injured and the aircraft was destroyed.
- On 29 July 2013, a Saab 340 UR-ARO operating a United Nations flight rolled off the runway while taking off at Lubumbashi International Airport in the Democratic Republic of the Congo as a result of the destruction of a propeller and engine. The aircraft was damaged beyond repair.
- On 9 March 2016, True Aviation Flight 21, an Antonov An-26 S2-AGZ operating a flight between Cox's Bazar and Jessore crashed into the Bay of Bengal shortly after take-off. The aircraft was attempting to return to the airport after experiencing an engine failure. Three of the four Ukrainian members of the flight crew, which were working for Air Urga under lease, were killed whilst one survived.
- On 28 July 2022, three Antonov An-26 and one Cessna 172 were destroyed in a Russian strike at Kropyvnytskyi (Kirovograd) Airport. The strike also destroyed other equipment and resources, including the airline's hangar. Four civilians and one member of the Armed Forces of Ukraine were killed.
- On 1 June 2023, a Saab 340 UR-ELZ operating a United Nations flight rolled off the runway while landing at Timbuktu Airport in Mali as a result of a thrust-reverser failure. The aircraft was not damaged nor any crew or passengers injured.
- On 10 February 2025, an Antonov An-26 UR-ELB operating a United Nations flight crashed into an embankment while on approach to Ndele Airport in the Central African Republic. The aircraft was damaged beyond repair and several members of the crew were hospitalised.
