= Kropyvnytskyi Airport =

- IATA: KGO; ICAO: UKKG

Summary
- Airport type: Public
- Owner: Kirovohrad Oblast
- Operator: Municipal Enterprise «Kropyvnytskyi Airport»; Air Urga; State Flight Academy of Ukraine
- Serves: Kropyvnytskyi
- Location: Kropyvnytskyi, Kirovohrad Oblast, Ukraine
- Hub for: Air Urga
- Elevation AMSL: 571 ft / 174 m
- Coordinates: 48°32′33″N 32°17′9″E

Maps
- Location of Kropyvnytskyi Airport in Ukraine KGO (Ukraine)
- Interactive map of Kropyvnytskyi Airport

Runways
Direction	Length		Surface
Direction	ft	m	Surface
16/34	4,268	1,301	Asphalt
16/34	5,249	1,600	Grass
- Source: skyvector.com

Kropyvnytskyi Airport (Ukrainian: Аеропорт «Кропивницький») (IATA: KGO, ICAO: UKKG) is an airport in Kropyvnytskyi, Ukraine. It also serves State Flight Academy of Ukraine

The airport is capable of handling An-2, An-24, An-26, An-28, An-30, An-32, An-72, An-74, An-140, L-410, Saab 340, Yak-40 aircraft. Just one of the two runways is currently operational (the 1300m one).

The airport does not currently have any scheduled flights, the last one being a Kropyvnytskyi-Odesa route operated by Air Urga in August 2016.

On 22 October 2010, the president of Ukraine Viktor Yanukovych has opened international terminal constructed by Air Urga company. The new terminal area is 500 square meters, its capacity is 50 passengers/hour. Construction cost was about US$500,000. The old domestic terminal area is 900 square meters. Both new international and old domestic terminal operator is Air Urga company.

Construction of the new 2,100 meters runway 12/30 now is temporarily suspended.

== See also ==
- List of airports in Ukraine
- List of the busiest airports in Ukraine
