= Zaytsevo =

Zaytsevo may refer to the following rural localities in Russia:

- Zaytsevo, Arkhangelsk Oblast
- Zaytsevo, Republic of Bashkortostan
- Zaytsevo, Belgorod Oblast
- Zaytsevo, Leningrad Oblast
- Zaytsevo, Syamzhensky District, Vologda Oblast
- Zaytsevo, Ustyuzhensky District, Vologda Oblast

== See also ==
- Zaytsev, a surname
- Zaitseve (disambiguation), a list of localities in Ukraine with the equivalent Ukrainian-language name
