= Horlivka urban hromada =

Horlivka urban hromada Горлівська міська громада
- Hromada
- Interactive map of Horlivka urban hromada
- Country: Ukraine
- Oblast: Donetsk Oblast
- Raion: Horlivka Raion
- Settlements: 10
- Cities: 1
- Rural settlements: 7
- Villages: 2

Horlivka urban hromada (Ukrainian: Горлівська міська громада) is a hromada of Ukraine, located in Horlivka Raion, Donetsk Oblast. Its administrative center is the city Horlivka.

The hromada contains 10 settlements: 1 city (Horlivka), 7 rural settlements:

- Fedorivka
- Holmivskyi
- Ozerianivka
- Panteleimonivka
- Piatykhatky
- Shyroka Balka
- Stavky

And 2 villages (Mykhailivka and Riasne).

== See also ==
- List of hromadas of Ukraine
