= Zaitseve =

Urban locality in Donetsk Oblast, Ukraine

Zaytseve Зайцеве
- Rural settlement
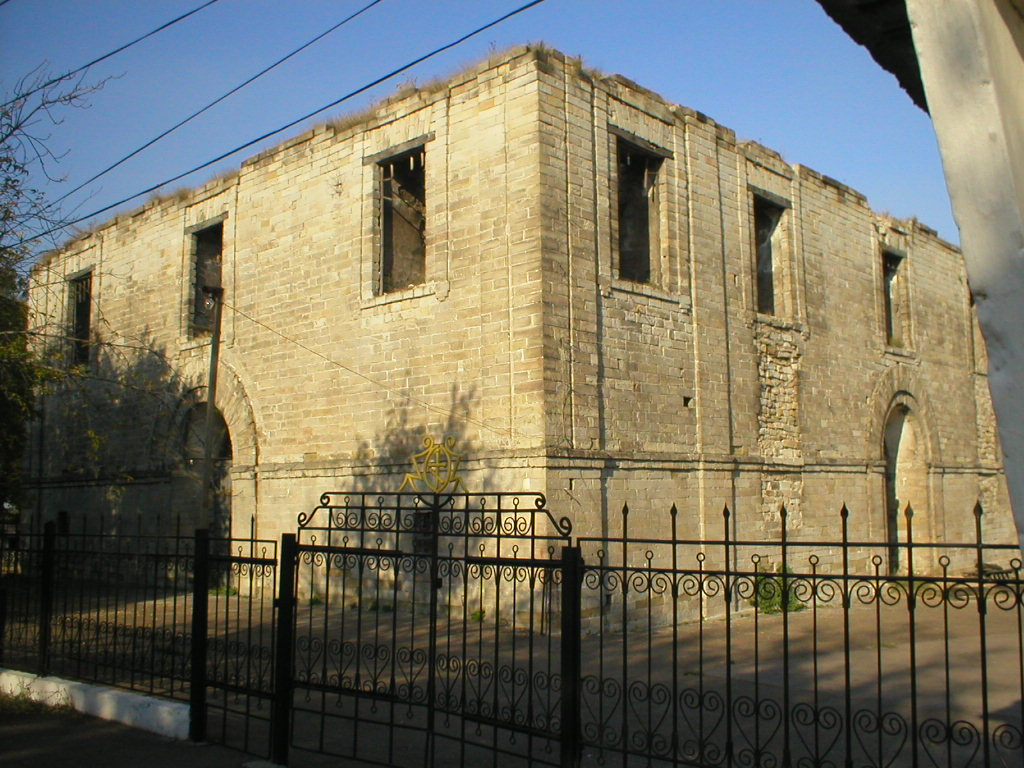
- Interactive map of Zaytseve
- Location of Zaytseve within Ukraine Zaytseve (Ukraine)
- Coordinates: 48°25′45″N 38°0′34″E
- Country: Ukraine
- Oblast: Donetsk Oblast
- Raion: Bakhmut Raion
- Established: 1938

Area
  - Total: 16.438 km^{2} (6.347 sq mi)
- Elevation: 129 m (423 ft)

Population (2022)
  - Total: 3,919
  - Density: 238.4/km^{2} (617.5/sq mi)
- Postal code: 84692
- Area code: +380 6242

Zaitseve (Ukrainian: Зайцеве; Russian: Зайцево, romanized: Zaytsevo) is a rural settlement in Bakhmut Raion, Donetsk Oblast, eastern Ukraine. Population: 3,919 (2022 estimate).

== History ==
Pro-Russian forces took the settlement under their control in the beginning of the War in Donbas, in 2014.

Ukrainian forces have the settlement under control since the second half of 2015.

The war has brought both civilian and military casualties. The settlement is located near the frontline between Ukrainian forces and the separatist Donetsk People's Republic in the war in Donbas. It is one of the suburbs of Horlivka that stayed under Ukrainian army control, unlike Horlivka which is under separatist control since April 2014. To facilitate the administration, the Ukrainian government transferred Zaitseve from the city of Horlivka to Bakhmut Raion, which is under the control of the central government.

On February 21, 2022, pro-Russian rebels shelled the town, killing two soldiers. A civilian in the nearby village of Novoluhanske, 51 year old Roman Shyrokiy, also died, becoming the war's first civilian casualty in 2022. Volodymyr Zelenskyy voiced a condemnation of the incident.

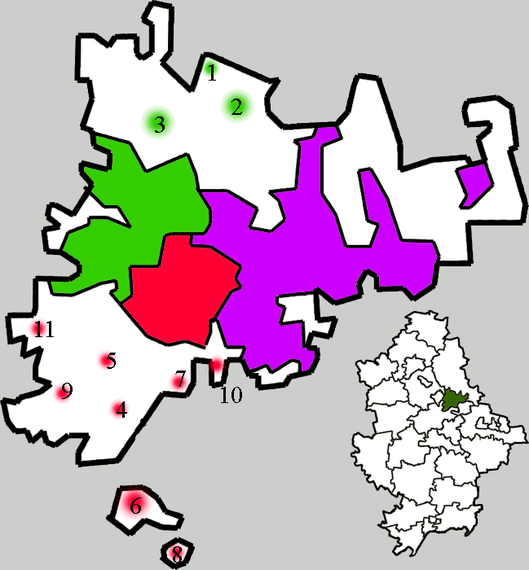
Administrative system of Horlivka: Districts of Horlivka: Kalinin Mykytivka Raion City Center / Populated places: 1 — Hladosove; 2 — Holmivskyi; 3 — Zaitseve; 4 — Mykhailivka; 5 — Ozeryanivka; 6 — Panteleymonivka; 7 — Piatykhatky; 8— Ryasne; 9 — Stavky; 10 — Fedorivka; 11 — Shyroka Balka

== Demographics ==
Native language as of the Ukrainian Census of 2001:

- Russian 93.15%
- Ukrainian 6.48%
