= Stavky, Horlivka Raion, Donetsk Oblast =

Stavky Ставки
- Rural settlement
- Location of Stavky within Ukraine Stavky (Ukraine)
- Coordinates: 48°15′4″N 37°56′29″E
- Country: Ukraine
- Oblast: Donetsk Oblast
- Raion: Horlivka Raion
- Hromada: Horlivka urban hromada
- Elevation: 168 m (551 ft)

Population (2001 census)
  - Total: 34
- Time zone: UTC+2 (EET)
  - Summer (DST): UTC+3 (EEST)
- Postal code: 84693
- Area code: +380 6236
- KATOTTH: UA14060030080059486

Stavky (Ukrainian: Ставки; Russian: Ставки) is a rural settlement in Horlivka Raion, Donetsk Oblast, eastern Ukraine.

== History ==
=== War in Donbas ===
The settlement was taken under control of pro-Russian forces during the War in Donbas, that started in 2014.

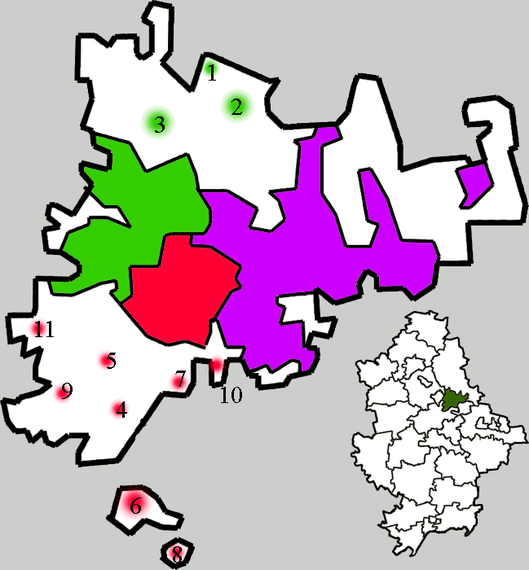
Administrative system of Horlivka: Districts of Horlivka: Kalinin Mykytivka Raion City Center / Populated places: 1 — Hladosove; 2 — Holmivskyi; 3 — Zaitseve; 4 — Mykhailivka; 5 — Ozeryanivka; 6 — Panteleymonivka; 7 — Piatykhatky; 8— Ryasne; 9 — Stavky; 10 — Fedorivka; 11 — Shyroka Balka

== Demographics ==
Distribution of native languages as of the Ukrainian Census of 2001:

- Ukrainian: 29.41%
- Russian: 70.59%
