= Svitlana Oleksiivna Shvachko =

Ukrainian linguist (born 1935)

Professor S. O. Shvachko Ph.D.
- Svitlana Oleksiivna Shvachko
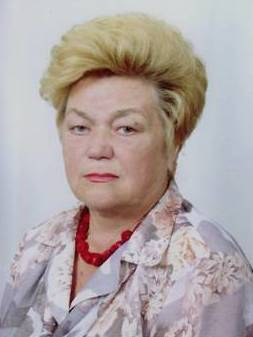
- Svitlana Oleksiivna Shvachko
- Born: November 25, 1935 (age 90); Kiev, Ukrainian Soviet Socialist Republic

Academic background
- Education: Horlivka State Pedagogical Institute of Foreign Languages
- Thesis: English numerals and their state in the lexico-semantic field of quantity (1982)

Academic work
- Discipline: Germanic philology
- Sub-discipline: Contrastive linguistics, Translation studies

Svitlana Oleksiivna Shvachko (Ukrainian Світлана Олексіївна Швачко; born 25 November 1935) is a Ukrainian academician of the Academy of Higher school of Ukraine and a Professor of the Department of Germanic Philology in Sumy State University.

== Life ==
Professor Shvachko was born on 25 November 1935 in Kiev, in the family of a serviceman. Graduated from Horlivka State Pedagogical Institute of Foreign Languages in 1956 and worked as a teacher of English at schools in Horlivka (1956–1961), and as a lecturer of English an associate professor of the Department of English Philology at Horlivka Pedagogical Institute of Foreign Languages (1961–1975).

In 1971, S.O. Shvachko defended a thesis on the "Evolution and functioning of measure and weight words in the English language", and in 1982 defended her doctoral thesis on "English numerals and their states in the lexico-semantic field of quantity".

In the period of 1975–1994 she worked as an associate professor of the Department of English Language at A.S. Makarenko Sumy State Pedagogical University, and from 1985 to 1993 she was head of the English department. In 1995 she initiated the establishing of the Department of Translation (now Department of Germanic Philology) at Sumy State University.

Shvachko is a member of specialized scientific councils of Kyiv National Linguistic University and V.N. Karazin Kharkiv National University; participant of numerous international conferences, forums, symposiums; co-chairman of organizing committees of six international conferences on theory of translation; member of editorial board of scientific journals (Visnyk of V.N. Karazin Kharkiv National University, Sumy State University, Kyiv National Linguistic University, European University etc.). She is a member of specialized scientific councils for defense of Candidate's and Doctoral dissertations, constantly referees monographs, textbooks and dissertations. She is an author of more than 500 scientific works, study guides and recommendations, and 11 postgraduates of the specialty 10.02.04 – Germanic languages defended their PhD theses under her supervision.

== Awards ==
S. O. Shvachko has received the following awards and honours:

- «For the excellent successes in the field of higher education of the USSR» (1974)
- «Winner of socialist competition of 1974» Minpros's boards of the USSR and presidium of the Ukrainian republican committee of specialist education, higher school and scientific institutions
- «Outstanding personality in Public Education of Ukraine» (1984)
- A.S Makarenko medal for high rates in teaching and educational work with students (1988)
- «Honored Professor of Sumy State University» (2005)
- «Woman of the Year» of the American Bibliographic Institute (2005)
- «Outstanding personality in Public Education of Ukraine» (2007)
- Diploma of the Academy of Pedagogical Sciences of Ukraine «For significant contribution to the training of highly qualified specialists, efficient scientific and educational activities devoted to the 60th anniversary of the institution establishment» (Sept. 2008)
- Award of Prince Yaroslav the Wise in Science and Technology (2010)

== Publications ==
A list of publications can be found at Google Scholar.
