= Zaitseve (disambiguation) =

Zaitseve is an urban-type settlement in Donetsk Oblast, eastern Ukraine. Zaitseve may also refer to several villages in Ukraine:

- Zaitseve, Crimea
- Zaitseve, Dnipropetrovsk Oblast
- Zaitseve, Bakhmut urban hromada, Bakhmut Raion, Donetsk Oblast
- Zaitseve, Luhansk Oblast

== See also ==
- Zaytsevo (disambiguation), a list of localities in Russia with the equivalent Russian-language name
