= Panteleimonivka =

Urban locality in Donetsk Oblast, Ukraine

Panteleimonivka Пантелеймонівка
- Rural settlement
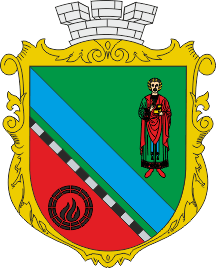
- Coat of arms
- Interactive map of Panteleimonivka
- Location of Panteleymonivka within Ukraine Panteleimonivka (Ukraine)
- Coordinates: 48°12′16″N 37°58′42″E
- Country: Ukraine
- Oblast: Donetsk Oblast
- Raion: Horlivka Raion
- Elevation: 180 m (590 ft)

Population (2022)
  - Total: 7,727
- Time zone: UTC+2 (EET)
  - Summer (DST): UTC+3 (EEST)
- Postal code: 84694-84698
- Area code: +380 6242

Panteleimonivka (Ukrainian: Пантелеймонівка, romanized: Panteleimonivka; Russian: Пантелеймоновка, romanized: Panteleymonovka) is a rural settlement in Horlivka urban hromada, Horlivka Raion, Donetsk Oblast, eastern Ukraine. It is located 34.3 kilometres (21.3 mi) northeast from the centre of Donetsk city. The population is estimated at 7,727 (2022 estimate).

On May 15, 2022, the Donetsk People's Republic militia took control over the settlement from the Ukrainian Armed Forces.

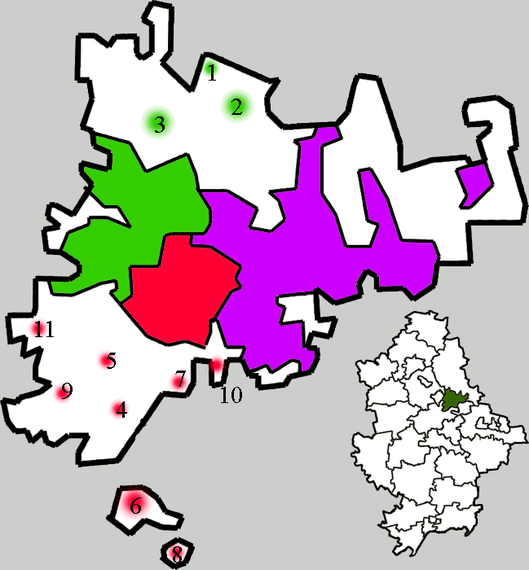
Administrative system of Horlivka: Districts of Horlivka: Kalinin Mykytivka Raion City Center / Populated places: 1 — Hladosove; 2 — Holmivskyi; 3 — Zaitseve; 4 — Mykhailivka; 5 — Ozeryanivka; 6 — Panteleimonivka; 7 — Piatykhatky; 8— Ryasne; 9 — Stavky; 10 — Fedorivka; 11 — Shyroka Balka

== History ==
The settlement was taken under control of pro-Russian forces during the war in Donbas, that started in 2014.

== Transport ==
There is a railway station in Panteleimonivka.

== Demographics ==
Native language as of the Ukrainian Census of 2001:

- Ukrainian: 21.16%
- Russian: 78.11%
- Armenian: 0.06%
- Belarusian and Romanian: 0.02%
- Moldavian: 0.01%
