= Mykhailivka, Horlivka urban hromada, Horlivka Raion, Donetsk Oblast =

Mykhailivka Михайлівка
- Village
- Location of Mykhaylivka within Ukraine Mykhailivka (Donetsk Oblast)
- Coordinates: 48°14′42″N 37°58′21″E
- Country: Ukraine
- Oblast: Donetsk Oblast
- Raion: Horlivka Raion
- Elevation: 215 m (705 ft)

Population (2001 census)
  - Total: 627
- Time zone: UTC+2 (EET)
  - Summer (DST): UTC+3 (EEST)
- Postal code: 84693
- Area code: +380 6242

Mykhailivka (Ukrainian: Михайлівка; Russian: Михайловка) is a village in Horlivka Raion of Donetsk Oblast of eastern Ukraine, at 36.9 km NNE from the centre of Donetsk city.

The village was taken under control of pro-Russian forces during the War in Donbas, that started in 2014.

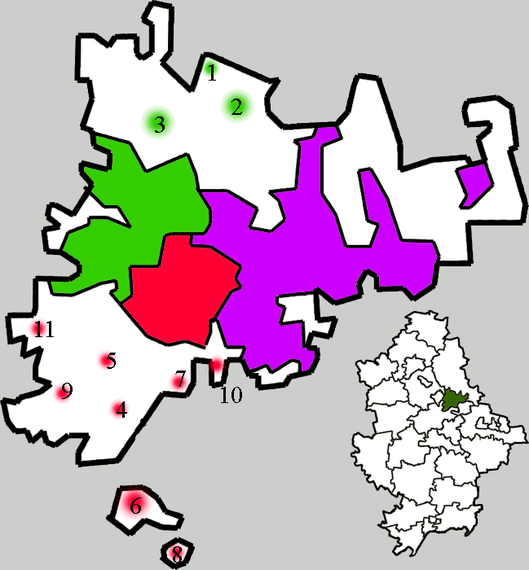
Administrative system of Horlivka: Districts of Horlivka: Kalinin Mykytivka Raion City Center / Populated places: 1 — Hladosove; 2 — Holmivskyi; 3 — Zaitseve; 4 — Mikhailivka; 5 — Ozeryanivka; 6 — Panteleymonivka; 7 — Piatykhatky; 8— Ryasne; 9 — Stavky; 10 — Fedorivka; 11 — Shyroka Balka

== Demographics ==
Native language as of the Ukrainian Census of 2001:

- Ukrainian: 20.10%
- Russian: 79.90%
