= Shyroka Balka =

Shyroka Balka Широка Балка
- Interactive map of Shyroka Balka
- Location of Shyroka Balka within Ukraine Shyroka Balka (Ukraine)
- Coordinates: 48°18′4″N 37°55′39″E
- Country: Ukraine
- Oblast: Donetsk Oblast
- Elevation: 134 m (440 ft)

Population (2001 census)
  - Total: 477
- Time zone: UTC+2 (EET)
  - Summer (DST): UTC+3 (EEST)
- Postal code: 84619
- Area code: +380 6242

Shyroka Balka (Ukrainian: Широка Балка; Russian: Широкая Балка) is a settlement in Horlivka municipality of Donetsk Oblast of eastern Ukraine, at 43.5 km NNE from the centre of Donetsk city.

During the War in Donbass, in 2015, the settlement was taken under control of pro-Russian forces of the self-proclaimed Donetsk People's Republic. In March 2023, the General Staff of the Armed Forces of Ukraine reported Russian shelling in the settlement.

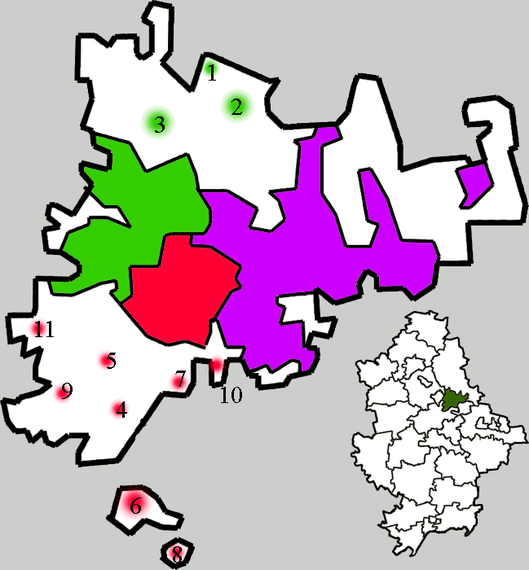
Administrative system of Horlivka: Districts of Horlivka: Kalinin Mykytivka Raion City Center / Populated places: 1 — Hladosove; 2 — Holmivskyi; 3 — Zaitseve; 4 — Mykhailivka; 5 — Ozeryanivka; 6 — Panteleymonivka; 7 — Piatykhatky; 8— Ryasne; 9 — Stavky; 10 — Fedorivka; 11 — Shyroka Balka

== Demographics ==
Native language as of the Ukrainian Census of 2001:

- Ukrainian: 71.28%
- Russian: 28.51%
- Belarusian: 0.21%
