= Alevtin Osipov =

Kazakhstani footballer (born 1969)

Personal information
- Date of birth: 13 May 1969 (age 57)
- Place of birth: Horlivka, Ukrainian SSR
- Height: 1.77 m (5 ft 10 in)
- Position: Defender

Senior career*
Years	Team	Apps	(Gls)
1987–1988	Ekibastuzets	22	(0)
1989	Sayany Abakan	18	(0)
1990–1998	Batyr Ekibastuz	285	(3)
1999–2000	Irtysh Pavlodar	31	(0)
2000–2003	Ekibastuzets	69	(3)

International career
1997	Kazakhstan	13	(0)
- * Club domestic league appearances and goals

Alevtin Osipov (born 13 May 1969) is a former Kazakh professional football player. He played for Ekibastuzets in the Soviet Second League and Kazakhstan Premier League.

== International career ==
Osipov made thirteen appearances for the Kazakhstan national football team in 1997.

== See also ==
- Football in Kazakhstan
