= Riasne, Donetsk Oblast =

Riasne Рясне
- Village
- Interactive map of Riasne
- Location of Riasne within Donetsk Oblast Location of Riasne within Ukraine
- Coordinates: 48°10′14″N 38°1′0″E
- Country: Ukraine
- Oblast: Donetsk Oblast
- Elevation: 222 m (728 ft)

Population (2001 census)
  - Total: 9
- Time zone: UTC+2 (EET)
  - Summer (DST): UTC+3 (EEST)
- Postal code: 84694
- Area code: +380 6242

Riasne (Ukrainian: Рясне; Russian: Рясное) is a village in Horlivka municipality of Donetsk Oblast of eastern Ukraine, at 36.1 km NE from the centre of Donetsk city. Riasne is the southernmost part of Horlivka municipality.

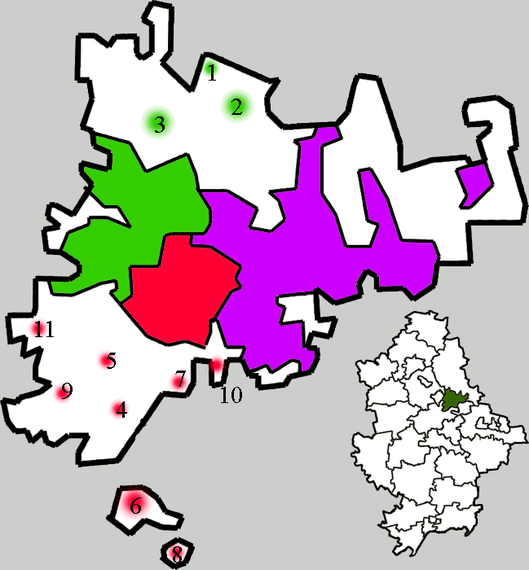
Administrative system of Horlivka: Districts of Horlivka: Kalinin Mykytivka Raion City Center / Populated places: 1 — Hladosove; 2 — Holmivskyi; 3 — Zaitseve; 4 — Mykhailivka; 5 — Ozeryanivka; 6 — Panteleymonivka; 7 — Piatykhatky; 8— Ryasne; 9 — Stavky; 10 — Fedorivka; 11 — Shyroka Balka

== Demographics ==
Native language as of the Ukrainian Census of 2001:

- Ukrainian: 66.67%
- Russian: 33.33%
