= Kirill Stremousov =

Ukrainian separatist politician (1976–2022)

- Кирилл Стремоусов
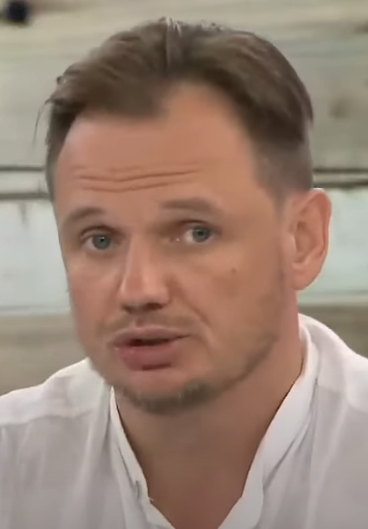
- Stremousov in 2020

Deputy Head of the Kherson Military-Civilian Administration
- In office 26 April 2022 – 9 November 2022
- Head: Volodymyr Saldo
- Preceded by: Position established

Personal details
- Born: 26 December 1976 Holmivskyi, Ukrainian SSR, Soviet Union
- Died: 9 November 2022 (aged 45) Henichesk, Kherson Oblast, Ukraine
- Cause of death: Traffic collision
- Resting place: Simferopol, Crimea
- Party: Socialist Party of Ukraine (2018–2019); Derzhava (2021–2022)
- Education: Ternopil Academy of National Economy
- Awards: Order of Courage (from Russia, posthumous)

Kirill Sergeyevich Stremousov (Russian: Кирилл Сергеевич Стремоусов, IPA: [strʲɪmɐˈusəf], Ukrainian: Кирило Сергійович Стремоусов, romanized: Kyrylo Serhiyovych Stremousov; 26 December 1976 – 9 November 2022) was a Ukrainian-born blogger and politician who served as the deputy head of the Kherson military–civilian administration in Russian-occupied Ukraine from 26 April 2022 until his death on 9 November 2022, just before Russia ordered a retreat from Kherson.

Prior to the war, Stremousov was a prolific blogger, known in fringe Ukrainian political circles for his promotion of conspiracy theories in support of Russian nationalism and against COVID-19 restrictions. He was also known for his involvement in numerous violent incidents, variously as the victim or the perpetrator.

== Early life ==
Stremousov was born on 26 December 1976 in Holmivskyi, Donetsk Oblast, Ukrainian SSR, USSR. He graduated from the Ternopil Academy of National Economy.

He worked "odd jobs" growing up. In an interview, Stremousov said he that owned a fish food company for five years, selling fish food abroad. Stremousov later became the head of the Henichesk Fish Inspectorate. In 2007, he was given a leading position in Kyiv's Fisheries Committee. In 2009, he resigned from his position and left Kyiv for Kherson.

== Conspiracy theories and political career in Ukraine ==
=== "Tavria News" and journey across Latin America ===
Following his arrival in Kherson, Stremousov founded the media company "Tavria News" in 2009. Journalist Sonia Lukashova of Ukrainska Pravda later said that the company could "hardly be called journalistic", and that Stremousov used it as a vehicle for PR and promoting his own ideology. Around the same time, he joined a local branch of Christian Democratic Union, a Ukrainian political party.

In the night of June 14, 2009, Stremousov was beaten up in Kherson by three men wearing camouflage uniforms after he filmed a traffic accident involving a private security agency. After beating him, the men took his phone and deleted the recordings he had made. Stremousov suffered a broken arm as a result. Stremousov claimed that he tried to get help from police as the assault was taking place, but they turned a blind eye to the assault.

In 2011, he traveled to the United States on a work visa to conduct research for a book. He worked as a laborer in Chicago for some time. Since he was already in the Americas, he decided to go on a motorbike trip across Latin America, retracing the footsteps of his "hero", the Argentinian Marxist revolutionary Che Guevara. He described the trip as an "epic journey in search of himself" that transformed his life.

=== Turn to esotericism and Russophilia ===
Upon his return from America, Stremousov became a prolific blogger, described by the Guardian as a "petty troublemaker" who "propagand[ized] some of the many conspiracy theories that had sprung up in the post-Soviet sphere", and a "marginal figure" in politics.

He conducted seminars on a mystical approach to a healthy lifestyle and became a follower of the post-Soviet neo-Pagan and neo-Stalinist conspiracy theory Concept of Public Security (Russian: Концепция общественной безопасности). One of the goals of the group was the establishment of a "unified East Slavic state". The conspiracy theory has also been described by the Guardian as having "strong antisemitic undertones".

In September 2013, Stremousov was one of the organizers of the "Russian runs", which were to show Kherson the "strength of the Russian spirit". The event began in the morning of September 21. Participants in the event displayed flags of far-right Russian nationalist groups and called for a revival of the Russian Empire.

In December 2013, he founded the organization "For the President", which provided explicit support to the pro-Russian President Viktor Yanukovych amid the Revolution of Dignity that would eventually unseat Yanukovych. Later on in the revolution, on March 1, 2014, Stremousov organized a pro-Russian rally in Kherson, allegedly declaring his intention to seize administrative buildings and establish a pro-Russian "Kherson People's Republic" similar to those established in the Donetsk and Luhansk regions of Ukraine.

According to local Kherson media outlet MOST, after the end of the revolution, he "disappeared for a year and a half" before resuming his activities. On 28 January 2016, he co-founded the Ukrainian Center for Environmental Self-Defense alongside Yuri Kleynos, a Ukrainian man who would later be charged with treason by the Ukrainian government for organizing pickets in Rivne in 2017 calling for the creation of a secessionist "Rivne People's Republic".

On 7 February 2017, Stremousov and five other men entered the office of Volodymyr Mykolayenko, the then-mayor of Kherson. They forcibly dragged Mykolayenko out of the building and threw him onto the sidewalk, filming the incident themselves. In the recorded video, Stremousov said his intention was to "teach a lesson" to the mayor and force him to clear the streets of ice. Civic activist Roman Tsviakh recalled years later that before the incident, several residents had fallen and broken bones due to the ice, and that by the next day, "the sidewalks were covered in salt". The same month, on 22 February, Stremousov beat a police officer during a scuffle in the Kherson City Council building, knocking the man to the floor and kicking him.

On 6 April 2018 he led an attack on a convoy of Security Service of Ukraine in Kherson, attempting to break out Sergei Osminin, a Yevpatoria city council member who had participated in the 2014 annexation of Crimea. In May 2018, Stremousov broke into a paid beach, and when a security guard attempted to remove him, he attacked the guard. After the guard sprayed him with a gas canister, Stremousov shot a man with a traumatic pistol (a non-lethal weapon), streaming the incident live on Facebook.

On 8 October 2018, he was named the head of the Kherson branch of the Socialist Party of Ukraine (SPU). On 18 January 2019, he was part of a group that fired at the Novy Den newspaper in Kherson. In January 2019, Stremousov was arrested and charged with hooliganism for his involvement in the attack. He was also expelled from the SPU, likely for the same reason. In the 2019 Ukrainian parliamentary election he was a candidate for the People's Deputy of Ukraine as a self-nominated candidate in the 82nd constituency, receiving 1.74% of the vote.

=== During the COVID-19 pandemic ===
During the COVID-19 pandemic, Stremousov started promoting anti-vaccination beliefs and conspiracy theories. In his videos he accused the authorities of spreading COVID-19, spoke about "US biolabs in Ukraine", and urged residents not to wear masks and not to adhere to restrictions. His YouTube channel was eventually blocked for spreading COVID misinformation. He and his supporters also broke into hospitals and threatened doctors. On September 29, 2020, he spoke at an anti-COVID restriction rally called "Stop Quarantine; Stop Genocide!" (Note: Ukrainian: Стоп карантин – Стоп геноцид!) in front of the building of the Government of Ukraine.

On 18 June 2020, he attacked journalist Dmytro Bagnenko and was involved in a criminal case under the article on obstruction of the journalist's work. In August 2020, the SBU conducted searches of Stremousov's properties as part of criminal proceedings to expose the Russian FSB.

On 9 November 2020, the Commission on Journalistic Ethics (CJE) of Ukraine reprimanded Stremousov for what they described as mass distribution of press cards for political purposes. In a statement, they said that his behavior resembled "personal PR" more closely than it did "the work of a news agency." Stremousov did not change his behavior, and continued issuing press cards to his followers throughout 2021, encouraging them to become "Stremousov journalists".

In the 2020 local elections he unsuccessfully ran for the post of mayor of Kherson as a self-nominated candidate, receiving just over 1% of the vote. Stremousov became a member of the pro-Russian Derzhava party in 2021.

== Russian invasion of Ukraine ==
Following the Russian invasion of Ukraine and the occupation of Kherson Oblast, Stremousov took a pro-Russian position. On 16 March 2022, Stremousov and other local pro-Russian activists held a meeting of the collaborationist Salvation Committee for Peace and Order in the building of the Kherson Regional Administration. The following day, the Ukrainian government accused Stremousov of treason for his role in this meeting and opened criminal proceedings against him.

On 26 April 2022, Stremousov was appointed by the Kremlin the deputy governor of the Kherson Military-Civilian Administration. Analysing this choice, The Guardian later said that "with much of the Kherson Ukrainian administration gone or refusing to serve the Russians, Moscow turned to figures such as Stremousov to try to give an appearance of legitimacy to their occupation."

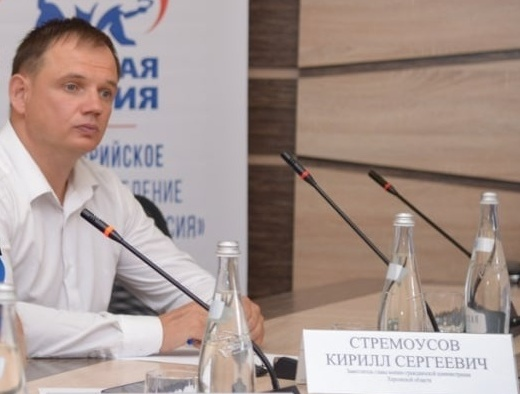
Stremousov in Yevpatoria, July 2022.

In an indication of an intended split from Ukraine, Stremousov announced two days later that the region would switch its currency to the Russian ruble the following month. Additionally, citing unnamed reports that alleged discrimination against Russian speakers, Stremousov said that "reintegrating the Kherson region back into a Nazi Ukraine is out of the question". On 11 May 2022, Stremousov announced his readiness to turn to President Vladimir Putin with a request for Kherson Oblast to join the Russian Federation, expressing his wish that there would be no referendum held or a declaration of an independent "Kherson People's Republic" before the annexation. After this announcement, leaflets started appearing around Kherson offering a ₴500,000 ($20,000) reward for Stremousov's assassination.

On 30 May, he spoke about exporting grain from Kherson to Russia: “We have space to store (the new crop) although we have a lot of grain here. People are now partially taking it out, having agreed with those who buy it from the Russian side." Stremousov also worked on selling sunflower seeds. On 3 June 2022, Stremousov was sanctioned by the European Union for providing support and promoting policies that undermine the territorial integrity, sovereignty and independence of Ukraine.

Analysis of a video made by Stremousov during the Ukrainian counter-attack on Kherson started on 29 August 2022 shows landmarks in the background that identify the location as the Marriott Hotel at 38 Revolyutsii Avenue, Voronezh, a city in southwestern Russia 550 miles (890 km) from Kherson. This is interpreted as being due to his having fled. When asked about his location, Stremousov said he was "travelling around Russian cities, meeting different people for work".

On 28 September, Stremousov received a Russian passport.

Amid the ongoing Ukrainian counteroffensive in the Kherson region, on 6 October Stremousov expressed dissatisfaction with "incompetent commanders" and blamed Russian defense minister Sergei Shoigu for having "allowed this situation to happen", adding that many suggest the minister should shoot himself.

On 3 November 2022, he posted a video on his Telegram channel urging residents of Kherson to evacuate the city.

== Death ==
On 9 November 2022, local Russia-aligned officials announced that Stremousov died in an alleged car crash near Henichesk, Russia's de facto headquarters in the region, at the age of 45. His death came hours prior to Russia's official retreat from the city of Kherson. Vladimir Rogov, a Russia-installed official in Zaporizhzhia Oblast, said that Stremousov died when his vehicle tried to avoid hitting a truck whose driver had made a "dangerous maneuver". RIA Novosti published video footage of a destroyed vehicle they said belonged to Stremousov on the roadside, with visible bloodstains on the road.

Several observers attributed the death to Russian security services. Yuriy Sobolevskyi, a regional Ukrainian Kherson official, expressed skepticism about the Russian report of Stremousov's death, saying "It may be true, or it may be staged." Pjotr Sauer of The Guardian expressed a similar assessment, saying that whether Stremousov's death was "indeed a genuine accident", or "the result of a Russian security services plan to get rid of an inconvenient loudmouth no longer useful to the authorities" was unclear.

Stremousov was buried on 11 November in Simferopol. His funeral was attended by First Deputy Chief of Staff of the Presidential Administration of Russia Sergey Kiriyenko, as well as by the head of the Kherson administration Volodymyr Saldo and by the head of the Zaporizhia administration Yevgeny Balitsky.

=== Reactions ===
President Vladimir Putin posthumously awarded Stremousov the Order of Courage. The Russia-backed administration of the Kherson Oblast promised to name a street after Stremousov in the city of Kherson and erect a statue to commemorate his life. In a post on the Telegram messaging app, Sergey Aksyonov, head of the Russia-annexed Crimea Peninsula, called Stremousov a “true fighter” and a “Russian patriot”.

Ukrainian legislator Oleksiy Honcharenko called Stremousov "a traitor who went over to the side of Russia," noting, "He actively opposed the surrender of Kherson and said that Russia is here forever. And then he mysteriously dies."

=== Posthumous conviction ===
On 18 October 2023 a court in Odesa found Stremousov guilty of treason and collaboration and he was sentenced to life imprisonment with confiscation of property. This conviction was possible because the Ukrainian special services had been unable to officially confirm the death of Stremousov.

== Personal life and family ==
According to official Ukrainian election documents, Stremousov had five children as of 2019.

In late 2017, Stremousov faced accusations of child abuse from netizens and international tabloids after he filmed himself spinning his four months old daughter around his head by her legs in what he called "exercise". While doing this, he said that he could hear “her bones are popping.” The video was later removed from YouTube.
