= Horlivka =

City in Donetsk Oblast of Ukraine

Horlivka Горлівка (Ukrainian) Горловка (Russian)
- City
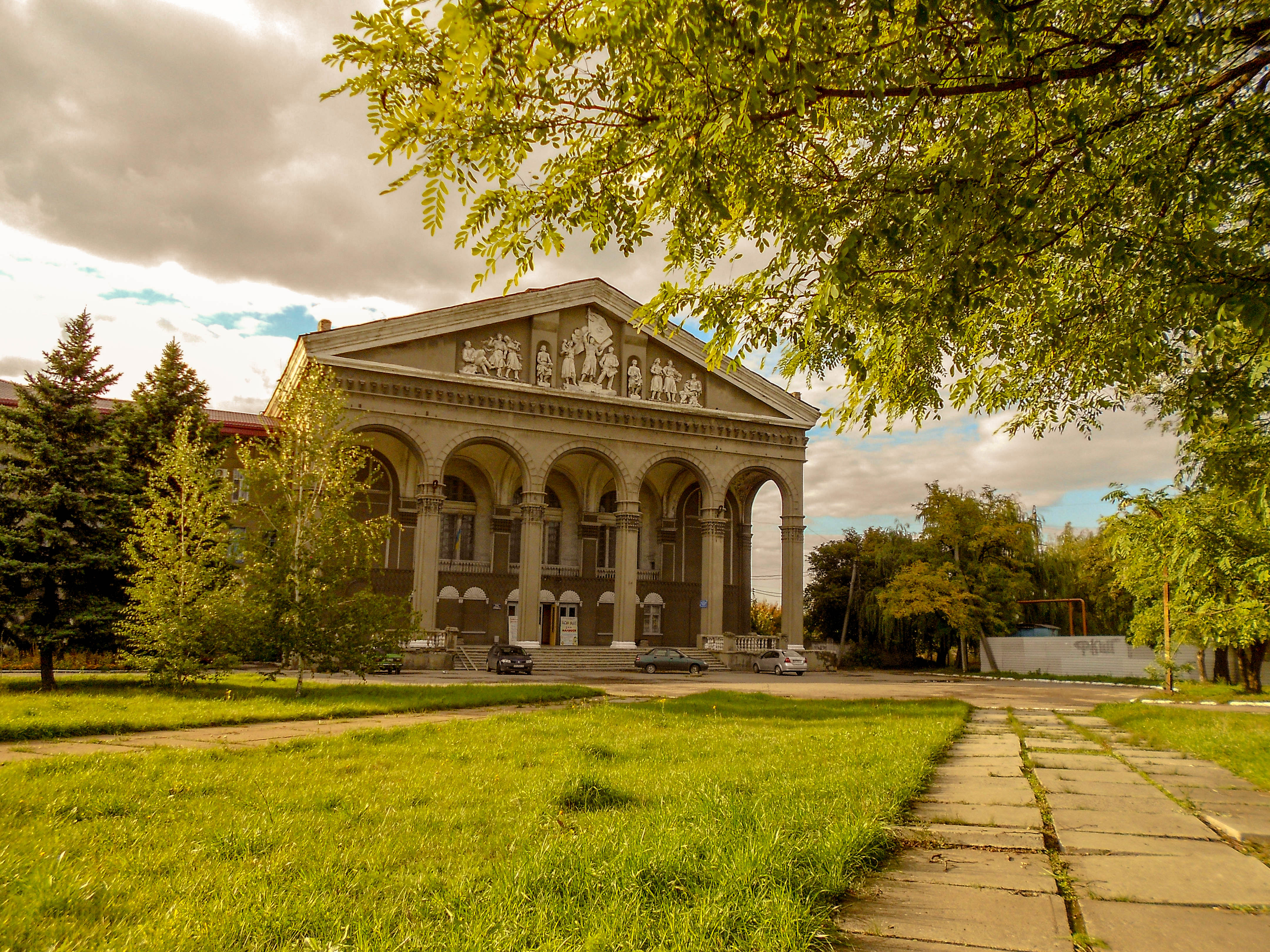
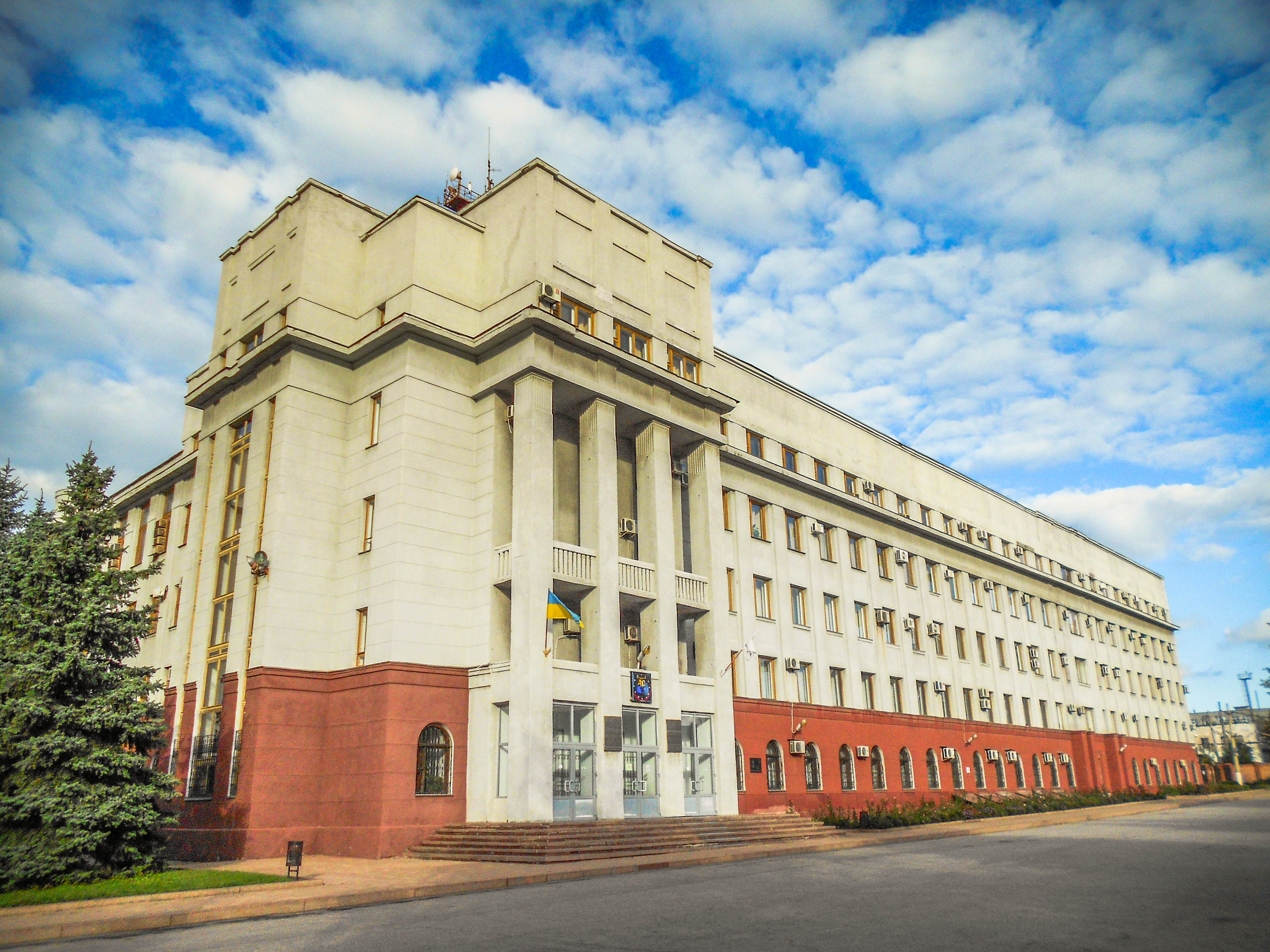
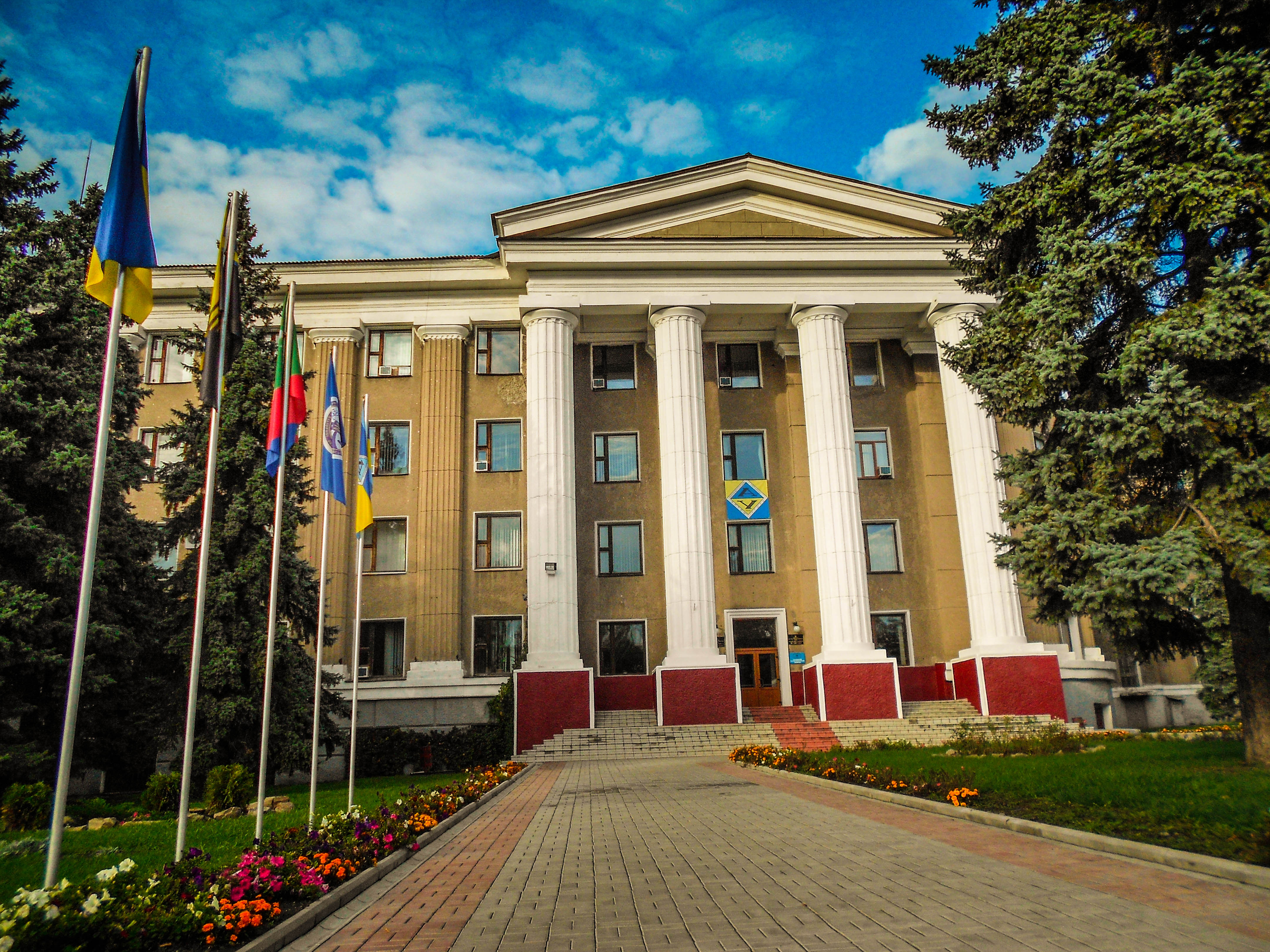
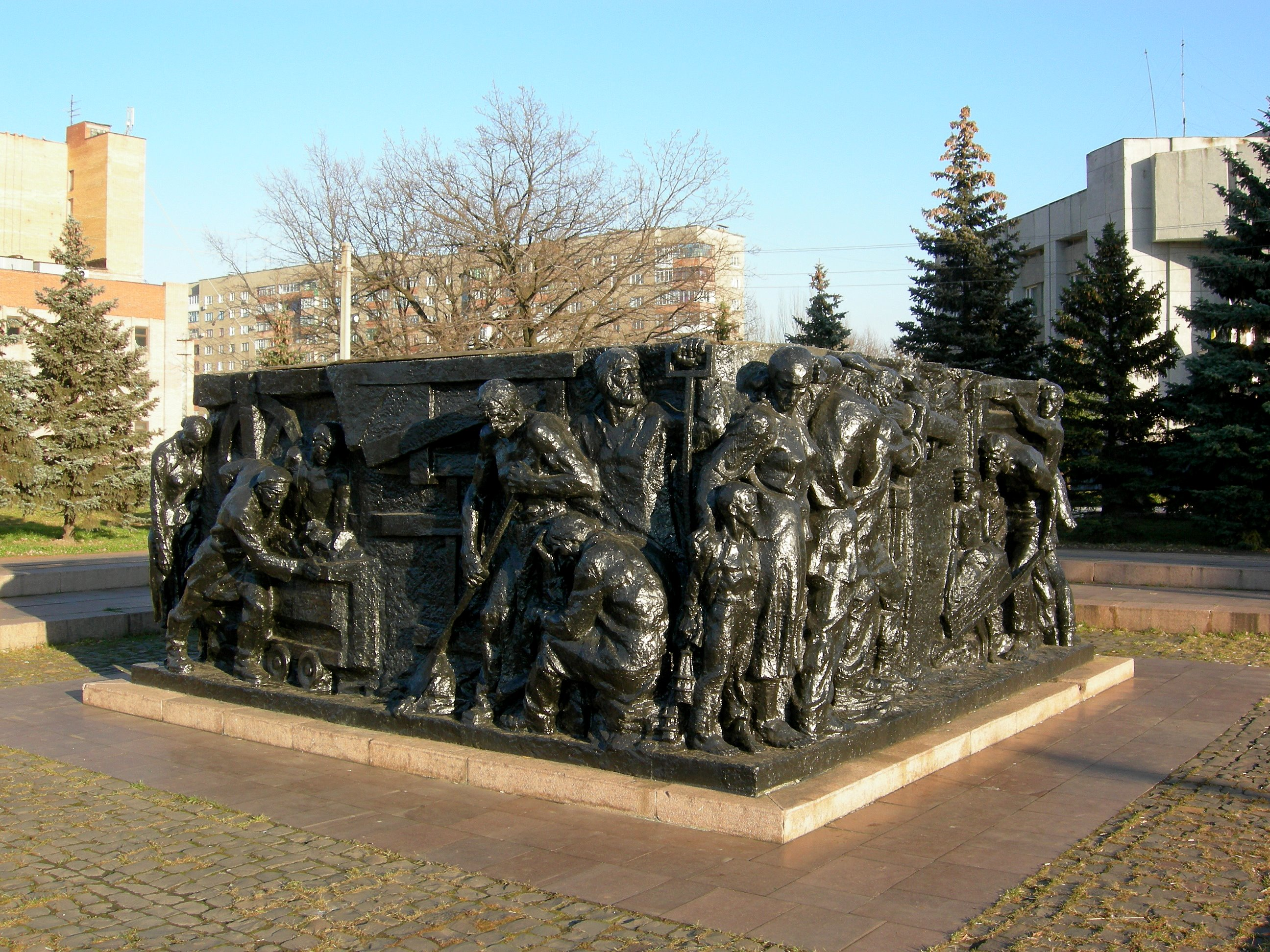
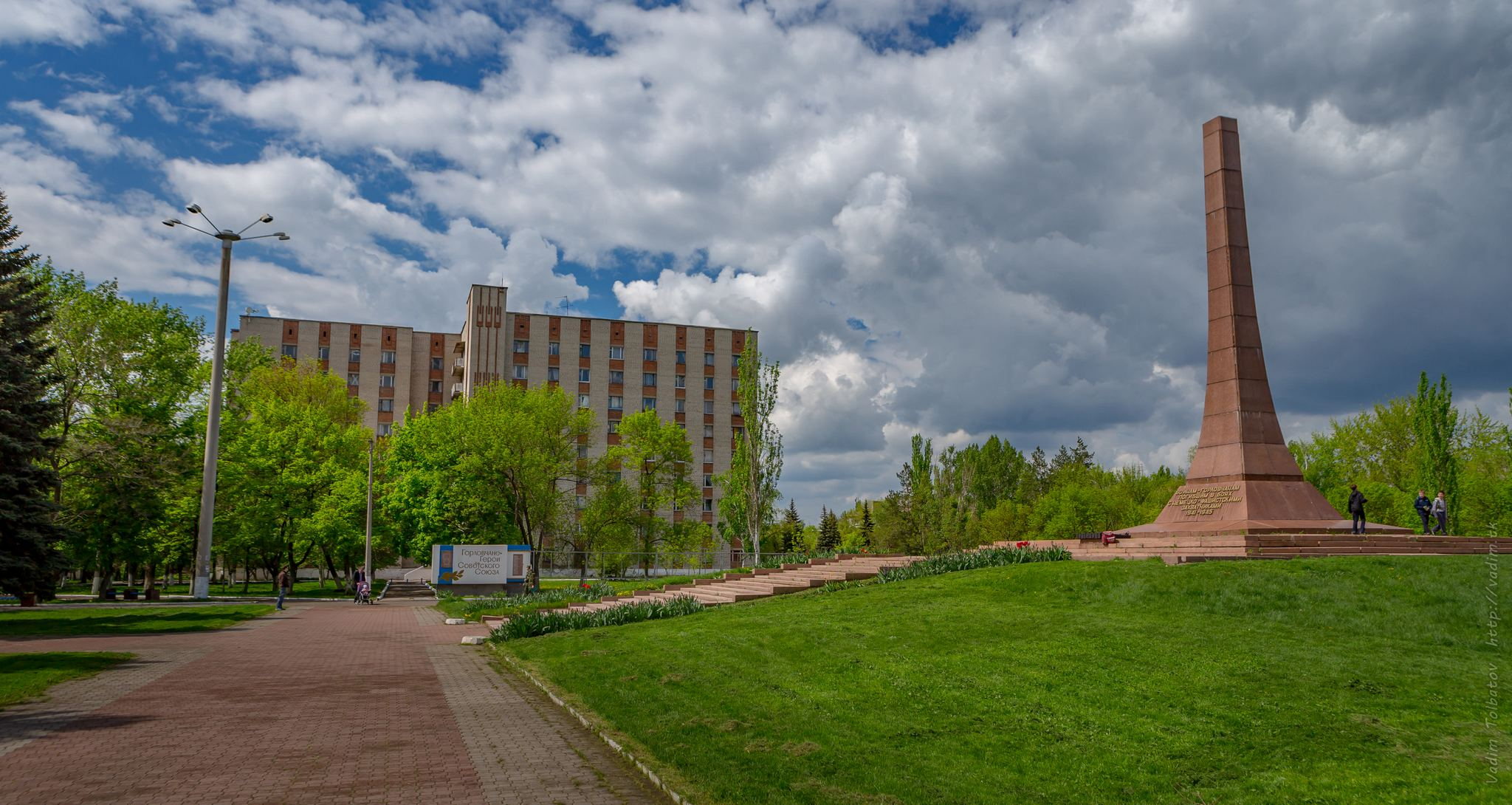
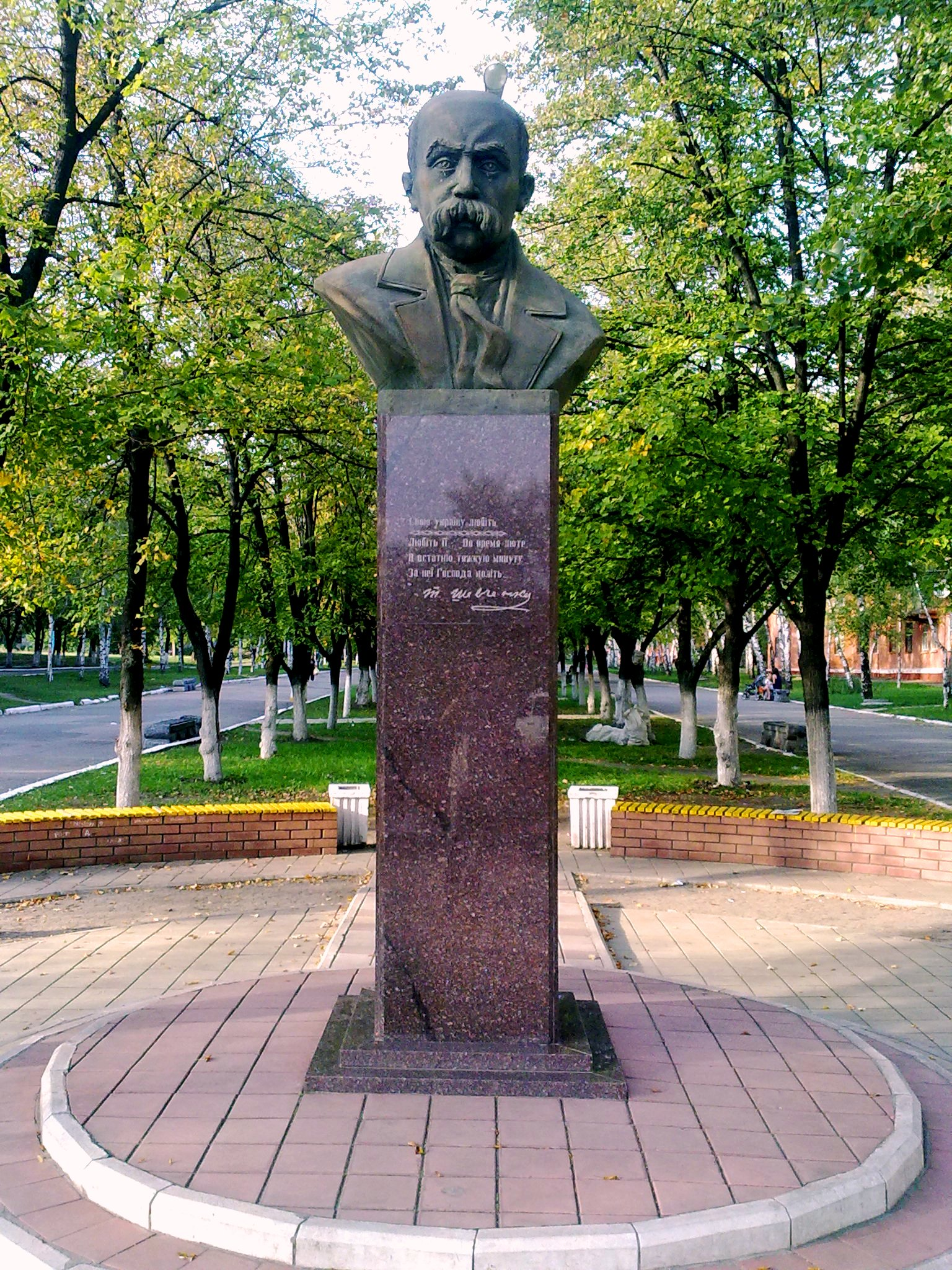
- Palace of Culture Donbasenergo office Artemvuhillia headquarters Horlivka Uprising Monument Obelisk Slavy Taras Shevchenko Monument

- Flag Coat of arms
- Anthem: Anthem of the Gorlovka urban district (de-facto)
- Interactive map of Horlivka
- Location of Horlivka in Donetsk Oblast Horlivka (Ukraine)
- Coordinates: 48°18′N 38°3′E
- Country: Ukraine
- Oblast: Donetsk Oblast
- Raion: Horlivka Raion
- Hromada: Horlivka urban hromada

Government
  - Mayor: Ivan Prikhodko (de-facto)

Area
  - Total: 422 km^{2} (163 sq mi)

Population (2022)
  - Total: 239,828
  - Density: 574/km^{2} (1,490/sq mi)
- Climate: Dfb

Horlivka (US: /ˈhɔːrlɪfkə/ HOR-lif-kə; Ukrainian: Горлівка, IPA: [ˈɦɔrl⁽ʲ⁾iu̯kɐ]), also known as Gorlovka (Russian: Горловка, IPA: [ˈɡorləfkə], local pronunciation: [ˈɦɔrlɐu̯kɐ]), is a city in Donetsk Oblast of Ukraine. Its population is 239,828 (2022 estimate).

Economic activity is predominantly coal mining and the chemical industry. The Horlivka Institute for Foreign Languages has a two-building campus in the city centre.

The city was severely damaged during the Battle of Horlivka in 2014 as part of the war in Donbas. Since 2014, it has been mainly under Russian occupation.

== Geography ==
Distance to Donetsk: 37 km by road, 53 km by rail.

The city is located on the western spurs of the Donetsk Ridge. Twenty-nine rivers flow through the city, but none cross it. The city is home to the headwaters of the Lugan (a tributary of the Seversky Donets), the Bakhmut (a tributary of the Seversky Donets), and the Korsun (a tributary of the Krynka). All are rivers of the Sea of Azov basin.

== Symbols ==
=== Coat of Arms ===
The shield is framed on the right and left by acacia branches entwined with a silver ribbon. To the left of the shield is an image of a miner holding a jackhammer in his left hand, and to the right is an image of Archangel Michael holding a spear. At the bottom of the ribbon is the inscription "Gorlovka" in red letters. Above the ribbon is a red carnation—a symbol of the city's revolutionary past. Below the ribbon is an image of five oak leaves.

Coats of arms of Horlivka

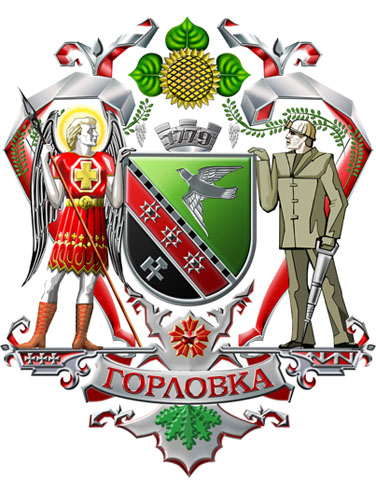
Large Coat of Arms

Medium Coat of Arms

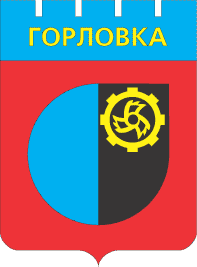
Soviet Coat of Arms

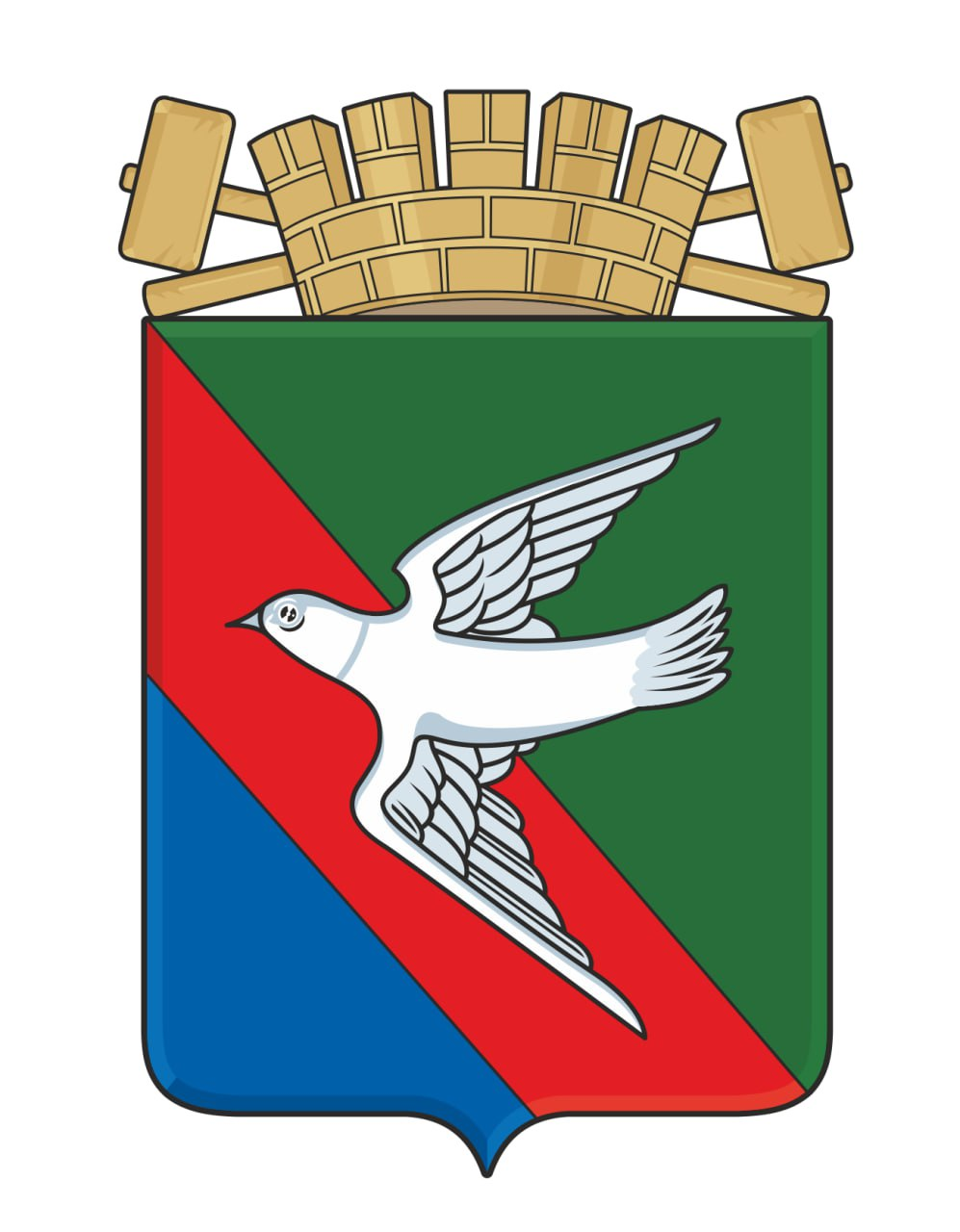
Coat of Arms used and approved by the Russian occupation authorities

=== Flag ===
The flag is a rectangular panel with a length-to-width ratio of 2:1. The flag is divided diagonally from the upper left corner to the lower right: the upper right half is green (with a turtledove in the upper right corner), the lower left half is also divided diagonally into the lower left corner, blue, and the remaining half, red. The dividing line runs along the midpoints of the flag's length and width.

Flag of Horlivka

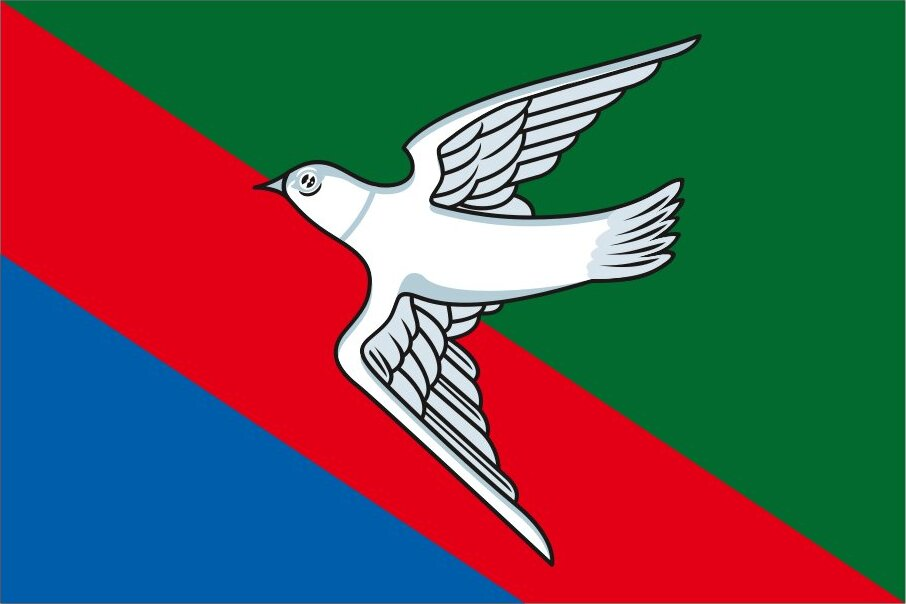
Flag of Horlivka used and approved by the Russian occupation authorities

=== Anthem ===
Words by E. Legostaev, music by A. Vysotsky. Approved by decision XXIII/10-28 of the City Council session on August 27, 1999.

Chorus:

We do not change Motherland,

Our dear mother is the same as she was.

In her alone we live and die,

May she always live.

Chorus:

Under the blue Ukrainian sky,

In a wreath of golden fields,

My city stands as a worthy son,

Of my free Motherland.

Gorlov and Izotov both lived here,

Achieving righteous labor and deeds,

Birthing a fusion of reason and work,

Song and a lofty soul.

Chorus:

Gorlovka is a land of labor and song,

And generous smiles, and fire,

That's why I'm happy and cheerful,

Because you and I are blood relatives.

== History ==
=== Foundation ===
The presence of about a hundred mounds on the site of today's Horlivka testifies to numerous human settlements in ancient times and makes it possible to study the city's history not from its founding, but several thousand years earlier.

The Cossack settlements better known to modern scholarship appeared in the 17th century, when Zaporozhians and fugitive peasants from the Russian Empire founded farmsteads along the Korsun, Zalizna, and Kodym rivers. To strengthen the borders of the Russian Empire, in the second half of the 18th century, the government formed Slavic-Serbian settlement regiments, comprising Serbs, Croats, Slovenes, and Vlachs who had fled Austrian oppression, as well as Ukrainian and Russian peasants and Cossacks. The regiments were divided into companies, which founded separate settlements on the territory of modern-day Horlivka.

Industrial Development In 1754, the village of Gosudarev Bayrak was founded. In 1776, the wintering quarters and farmsteads in the Sukhoi Yar ravine and the Zhovanka tract merged to form the Zaitseve settlement, the southern part of which was named Mykytivka, in honor of one of its residents, Mykyta Deviatylov. In 1795, the village of Gosudarev Bayrak and the settlement of Zaitseve (both within the city limits of today's Horlivka) had a combined population of 6,514, while the settlement of Zalizne had 3,529 residents in 1884. Between 1800 and 1805, Shcherbynivka and Nelipivka were founded. The settlement of Zalizne emerged, populated primarily by immigrants from the Kharkiv province. In the early 19th century, coal deposits were discovered here, and small peasant mines were established.

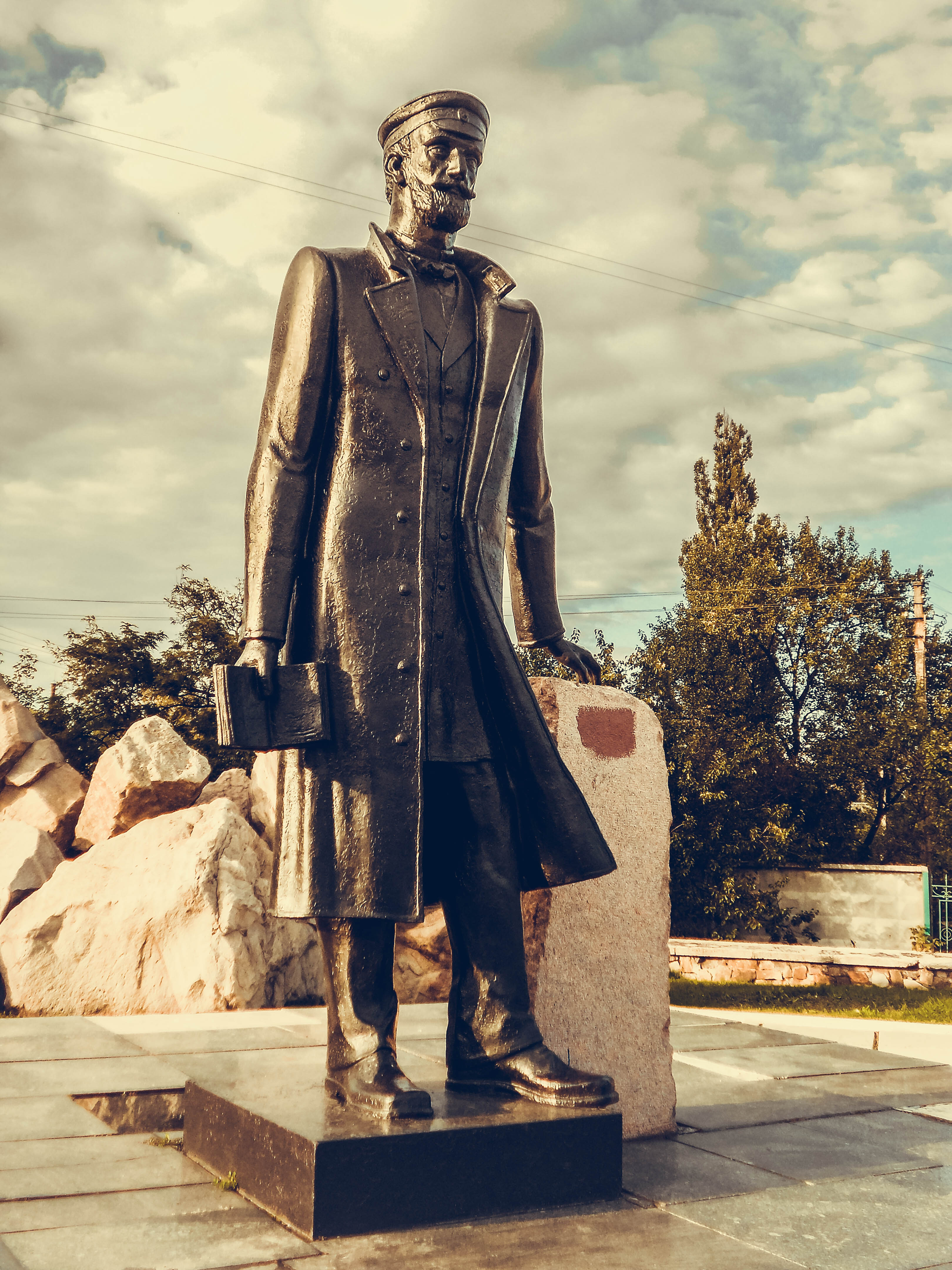
Monument to Pyotr Gorlov, founder of the city.

With the start of construction of the Kursk-Kharkiv-Azov Railway in 1867, a settlement and a railway station of the same name, Korsun, were founded (later the settlement and station were named Horlivka), as well as a coal mine, named Korsunska Mine No. 1, consisting of two shafts, which were constructed by the mining engineer Pyotr Nikolaevich Gorlov, who also developed a technology for extracting steeply dipping coal seams.

In 1889, near the settlement of Horlivka (located in the Bakhmutsky Uyezd of the Ekaterinoslav Governorate), the industrialist A. N. Glebov discovered an anthracite deposit and began its development. Glebov managed to draw the government's attention to the enormous importance of his work both for the Donetsk region and for the whole of Russian Empire, and to receive a subsidy of 1.2 million rubles for the construction of metallurgical plants. In 1895, A. N. Glebov formed the Sovereign Bayrak Partnership, the founders of which, in addition to him, were his brother N. N. Glebov, the owner of the dolomite plant at Mykytivka station, K. F. Medvensky, and mining engineer L. G. Rabinovich. A. N. Glebov purchased a plot of land from the peasants of the village of Gosudarev Bayrak and built the St. Andrew's Mine. It was commissioned in 1897. During the Soviet era, the mine was named after M. I. Kalinin.

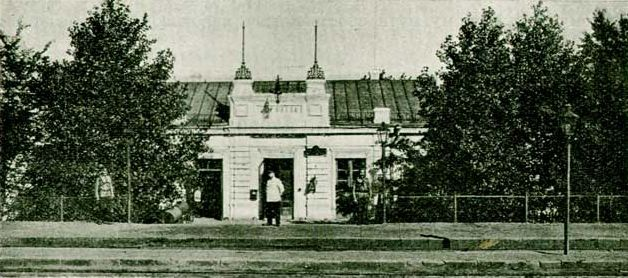
Railway station in 1912.

In 1913, 50 enterprises operated in Horlivka, employing a total of 13 thousand people. Horlivka, a provincial town, had a population of over 30,000. In the center stood the homes of the enterprise owners and engineering and technical workers, several dozen barracks, and typical three-window houses, arranged in 18 rows of 70 houses each. About 10,000 workers lived in semi-dugouts, sheds, and summer kitchens. There were three hospitals with 80 beds, two parish schools, four factory schools, and ten two-class zemstvo schools, a foreman's school (training foremen, mine surveyors, and hoist operators), a club theater, and a movie theater (the "Banaker" Club-Cinema, seating 300, since 1914).

In 1916, Horlivka officially became a city. In April 1918, troops loyal to the Ukrainian People's Republic took control of Horlivka.

=== Early Soviet period and War ===
Subsequently, under Soviet control, in 1925, the district center of Horlivka was created from mining and industrial settlements, with a population of 27,300 (40,500 residents including the settlements). At that time, Horlivka's mines produced 2.2 million tons of coal per year. During the industrialization years (late 1920s - early 1930s), Horlivka saw the reconstruction of old enterprises and the construction of new ones. Major industrial construction projects were underway: a coke plant in 1928, the Rumiantsev mine in 1932, the Kocheharka mine in 1933, and the Sergo Ordzhonikidze nitrogen fertilizer plant in April 1933. That same year, the world's largest cutting machine workshop (3,000 units per year) was built at a machine-building plant. In 1941, Mine No. 4-5 "Mykytivka," the largest mine in the Donbas, was commissioned.

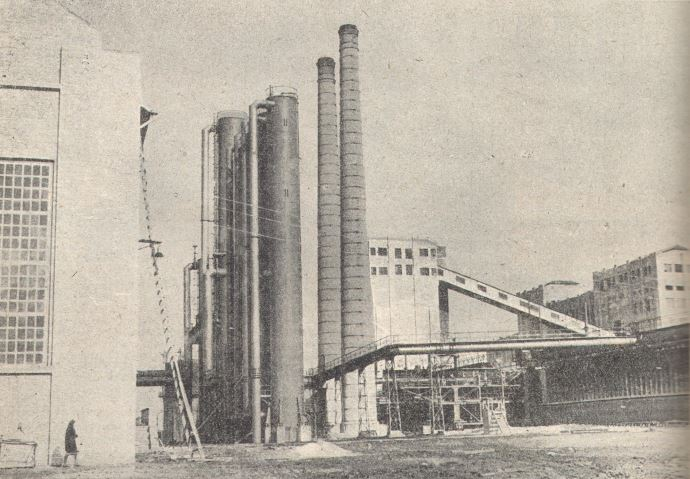
Mine in Horlivka in 1929

In 1929, a mining technical school was established on the site of the former foreman's school. In 1932, the first tram line, 8 km long, was built, connecting the settlements of mines No. 1 and No. 5. By the 1930s it had expanded considerably and become a major center for mining operations in the Ukrainian SSR. In 1932, Horlivka was slated to become the administrative center of Donbas, but the person in charge, Lazar Kaganovich, appalled by the impassable mud near the Kocheharka mine, decided to go to Donetsk.

As part of a cultural and social expedition commemorating the 17th Party Congress in 1934, the idea of creating an underground refreshment center for miners was realized. A refreshment center opened in Shaft No. 1 at a depth of 690 meters, serving cold breakfasts to 200 (260) underground workers. The refreshment bar is located near the mine shaft.

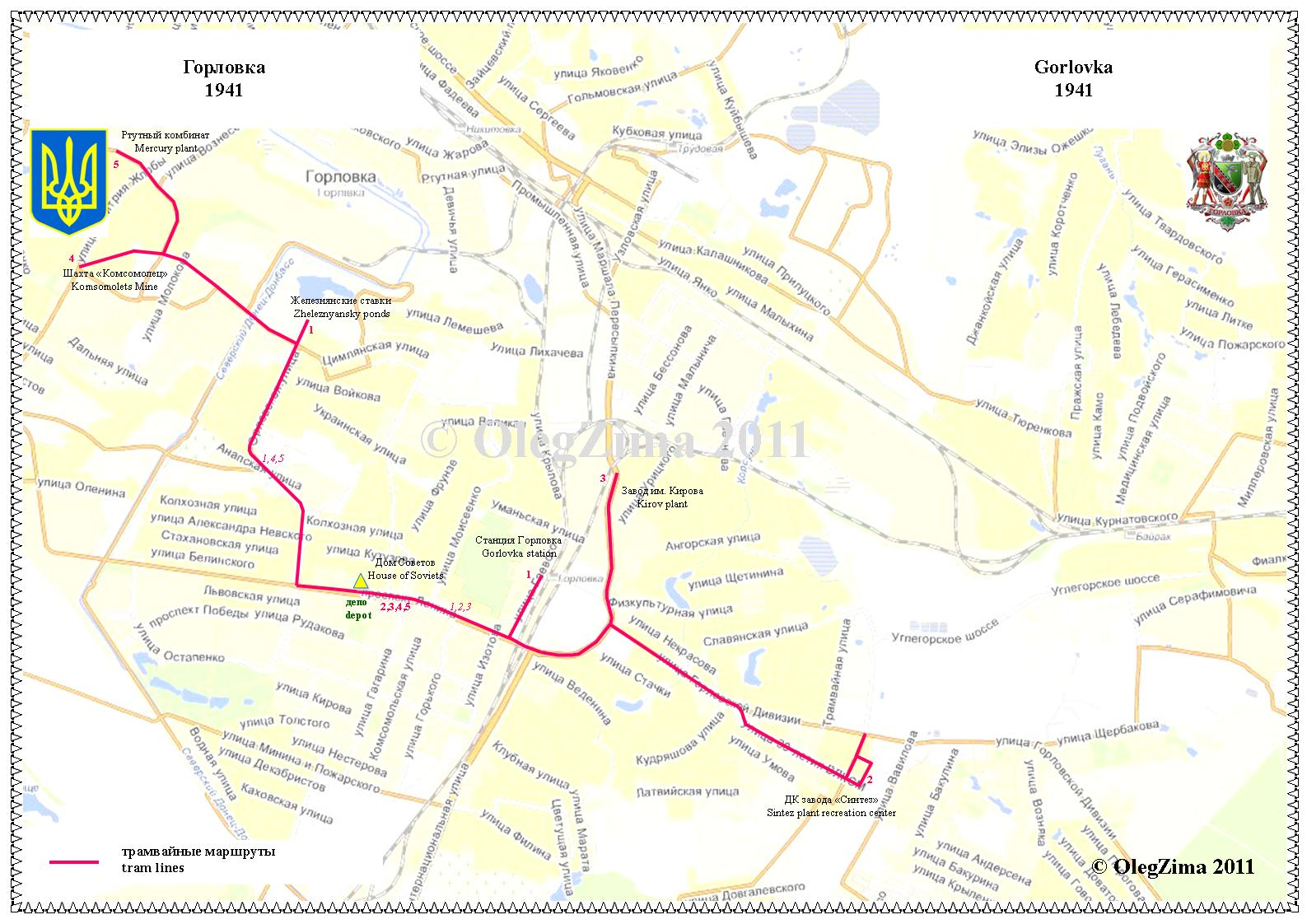
City transport in 1941.

By 1940, the city had 10 factories and 13 mines with a total annual coal production of 7.2 million tons, and a population of 181,500 and area 100 km^{2}. A new water supply and sewerage system, a printing house, a factory kitchen, a post office, a department store, two bathhouses, a hotel, and a stadium were built. The population was served by six hospitals, three maternity hospitals, a children's sanatorium, three ambulance stations, 54 kindergartens, 68 schools, 22 cultural centers and clubs, and 25 libraries. In the early 1930s, a medical and arts faculty, a workers' arts faculty, a factory and plant school of public catering, branches of the Higher Engineering and Technical Courses and the Industrial Academy, and a school for livestock breeders and gardeners opened.

On June 16, 1941, the following cities of district subordination were abolished within the territory of the Horlivka Soviet:

- Kalininsk (formed the Kalinin District of Horlivka)
- Komsomolsk (became part of the Mykytivskyi District of Horlivka)
- Mykytivka (formed the Mykytivskyi District).

During the Second World War, the Horlivka mines were flooded by retreating Soviet troops, and equipment from the S. M. Kirov Machine Building Plant was evacuated to the Urals. The city was captured by Italian troops and occupied by German troops from 1941 to 1943. The Germans operated the Dulag 111 transit prisoner-of-war camp in the city.

After the Soviets recaptured the city on September 4, 1943, a movement to restore the coal industry arose in the Horlivka mines under the leadership of Maria Hryshutina with the slogan "Girls! To the coalface!". Retreating Germans burned buildings and perpetrated mass shootings. Nonetheless, the city's population had risen to over 400,000 by the end of the war.

=== Post-war period ===
By 1950, water, electricity, and sewer systems were operational. All schools were restored. In the post-war years, new residential neighborhoods were built in the city away from industrial enterprises, the water supply was improved, and the sewer system was reconstructed. All schools and preschools, 11 cultural centers and clubs, and 7 parks of culture and recreation were restored. In 1954, the Pedagogical Institute of Foreign Languages was transferred from Bila Tserkva to Horlivka.

By 1955, the city's population reached 204,000. Between 1956 and 1958, six mines, a repair and mechanical plant, three concrete plants, a woodworking plant, and 11 large workshops were commissioned in Horlivka. An art museum has been operating since 1959. Between 1959 and 1965, 18 enterprises were built, reconstructed, and expanded, including the Gagarin Mine, which was commissioned in December 1963. By 1979, the city's population reached 337,000.

=== 21st Century ===
In October 2013, the reconstruction of the Horlivka Palace of Culture was completed.

==== War in Donbas ====
In the middle of April 2014, and shortly thereafter, pro-Russian separatists captured several towns in Donetsk Oblast. A group of separatists seized the police station in Horlivka on 14 April; the city hall was seized on 30 April. The mayor of the city, Yevhen Klep, was detained by the separatists on 11 June and not released until 18 July. Local chief of police Andriy Kryschenko was captured and badly beaten by the insurgents. (Note: On 6 April 2015, Interior Minister Arsen Avakov appointed Andriy Kryschenko police chief of Kharkiv. On 15 December 2015, he was appointed Chief of the National Police of Ukraine in Kyiv.) A Horlivka city council deputy, Volodymyr Rybak, was kidnapped by the pro-Russian militants on 17 April. His body was later found in a river on 22 April. The city administration building was seized on 30 April, solidifying separatist control over Horlivka. Self-proclaimed mayor of Horlivka Volodymyr Kolosniuk was arrested by the SBU on suspicion of participation in "terrorist activities" on 2 July.

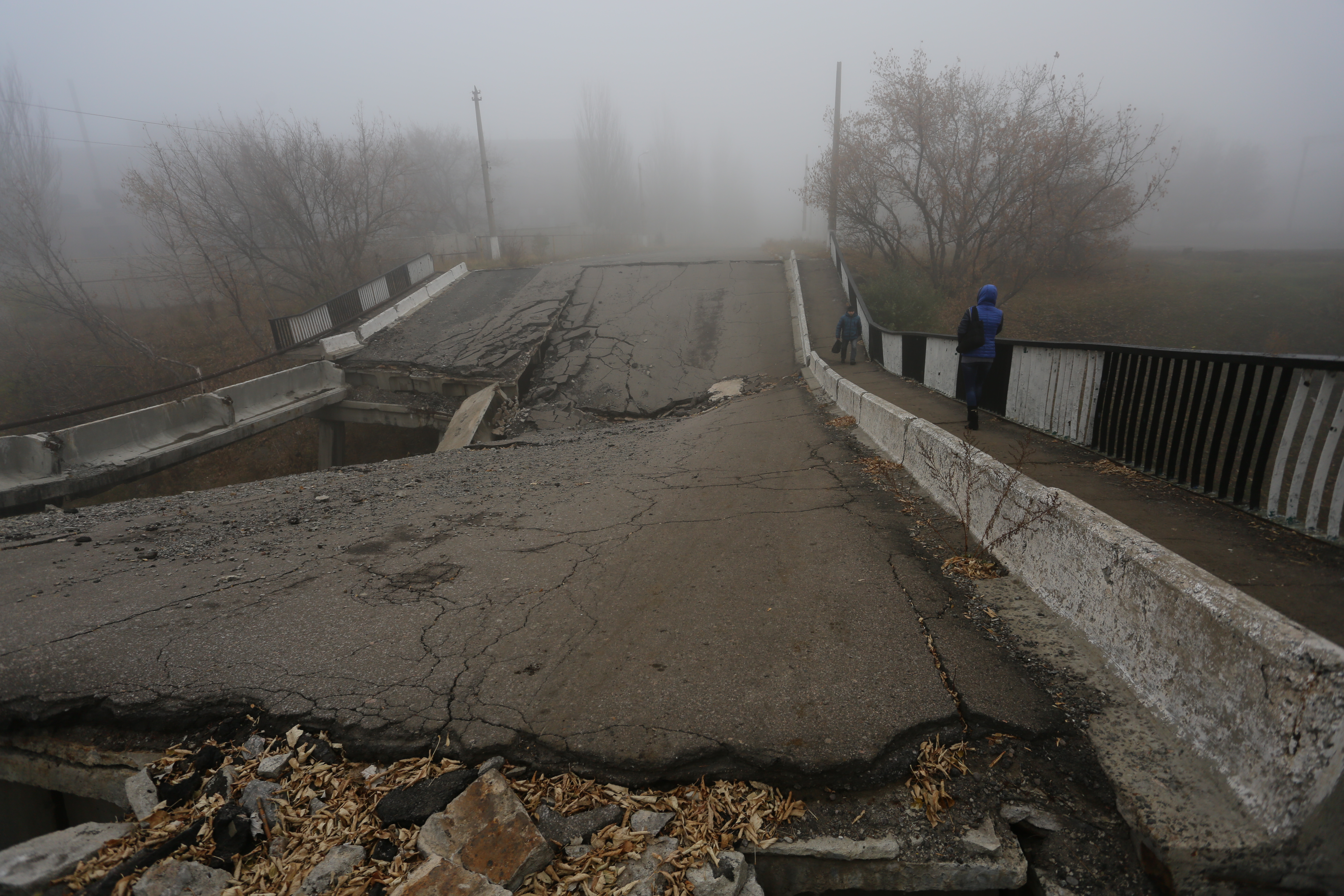
Damaged bridge after shelling of June 2014

On 21 and 22 July 2014, the city saw heavy fighting. The Ukrainian army reportedly retook parts of Horlivka on 21 July. After the Ukrainian army had retaken Lysychansk on 25 July 2014, the recapture of Horlivka became a priority, for the city was seen as "a direct path to the regional center – Donetsk". As of 28 July, the city was reported to be fully surrounded by Ukrainian troops, with rebels holding their positions inside. However, Horlivka continued to be controlled by separatist forces. As of June 2015, it was situated ten kilometers from the war front. Suburbs of Horlivka stayed under Ukrainian army control. In November 2017 they regained control of the villages of Travneve and Hladosove north of Horlivka.

As reported by the city administration, from the beginning of the conflict until late January 2015, 274 local civilians were wounded and 92 killed, including nine children. Because of the conflict the city's population shrank to 180,000.

In late March 2019, according to Ukrainian media reports, Ukrainian army mine clearance specialist Andriy Shor, who participated in both battles for the Donetsk Airport and the Battle of Pisky, announced on Facebook that the Ukrainian army had recently entered Horlivka city. Unian reported that Ukrainian forces had secured the outskirts of the city and were slowly advancing further towards the center of Horlivka, citing Ukrainian volunteer Yuriy Mysiahin. In May the separatists tried to push the Ukrainian forces back, but failed.

As of 2020, the city remained under separatist control. In June 2020, the former head of DPR propaganda in Horlivka handed himself to SBU.

In July 2020, as part of the reform of administrative divisions in Ukraine, Horlivka was made the administrative center of Horlivka Raion. This new status is not recognized by the pro-Russian occupation authorities.

=== Russian invasion of Ukraine ===
On 15 September 2022, the Intelligence Directorate under the Ukrainian Ministry of Defence reported that the occupying Russian forces were tasked with conscripting an additional 6,000 local residents. This, combined with previous conscription campaigns, and residents fleeing the city, left Horlivka near devoid of a male population of military age.

During the 2023 Ukrainian counteroffensive, Ukrainian forces reached the suburbs of Horlivka and nearby slagheaps.

== Demographics ==
Population of Horlivka (blue) and Horlivka municipality (red), 1884-2015

Year	Inhabitants	Municipality
1795	6,514	–
1884	3,529	–
1897	7,024	–
1923	11,476	16,566
1927	23,149	40,500
1933	57,902	?
1934	57,000	?
1937	85,700	191,400
1939	109,308	214,777
1955	204,000	?
1956	239,600	?
1959	292,616	336,037
1961	307,000	?
1964	333,000	?
1965	337,000	?
1970	335,064	353,350
1971	336,000	?
1977	342,000	?
1979	336,487	360,922
1987	345,000	?
1989	338,106	
1992	336,100	?
1994	332,100	?
1998	309,300	?
2000	299,000	?
2001	292,250	314,660
2003	287,319	?
2004	283,309	305,200
2005	279,061	?
2006	275,452	?
2007	272,376	?
2008	269,124	?
2009	266,270	287,030
2010	263,647	284,343
2011	261,052	281,668
2012	258,879	279,500
2013	256,714	277,117
2014	254,416	274,694
2015	250,991	271,096

Horlivka Cathedral

Ethnic composition as of the Ukrainian Census of 2001:

Ethnicity	Number	%
Ukrainians	160,397	51.4
Russians	139,980	44.8
Belarusians	4,079	1.3
Tatars	876	0.3
Armenians	784	0.3
Moldovans	720	0.2
Azeris	647	0.2

First language as of the Ukrainian Census of 2001:

- Russian 85.1%
- Ukrainian 13.9%
- Belarusian 0.1%
- Armenian 0.1%

== Administration and infrastructure ==
Despite the fall of communism a statue of Lenin still stands in a central square bearing his name. Horlivka is well served by CNG-buses (see Natural gas vehicle), but much of the city's Soviet-era infrastructure shows signs of deterioration. By contrast, a number of modern shops and a new cathedral (completed 2014) in the town center indicate some rejuvenation.

On the eastern side of Horlivka there is an abandoned chemical plant which used to produce toxic explosives and has been reported to be in a dangerous condition. Mining activity has resulted in large spoil tips being visible around the city, but a tree planting project and ongoing forestry maintenance has revitalised an area to the north.

The city was severely damaged during the war in Donbas.

=== Administrative divisions ===
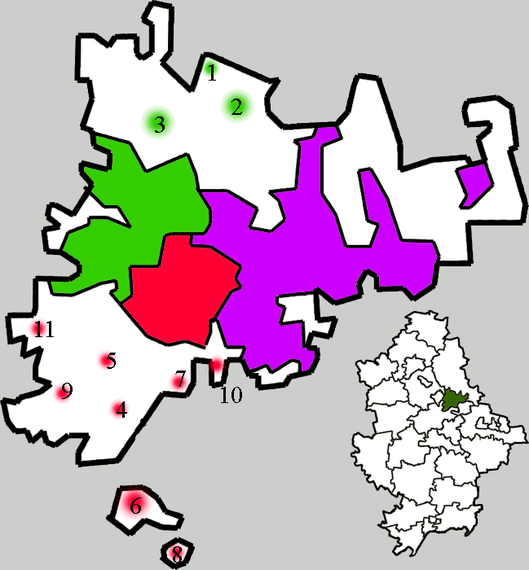
Administrative system of Horlivka: Districts of Horlivka: Kalininskyi (Kindrativskyi) District Mykytivskyi District Tsentralno-Miskyi District / Populated places: 1 — Hladosove; 2 — Holmivskyi; 3 — Zaitseve; 4 — Mykhailivka; 5 — Ozerianivka; 6 — Panteleimonivka; 7 — Piatykhatky; 8 — Riasne; 9 — Stavky; 10 — Fedorivka; 11 — Shyroka Balka

The city of Horlivka covers an area of approximately 150 square kilometers. There are 340 square meters of public green spaces per capita.

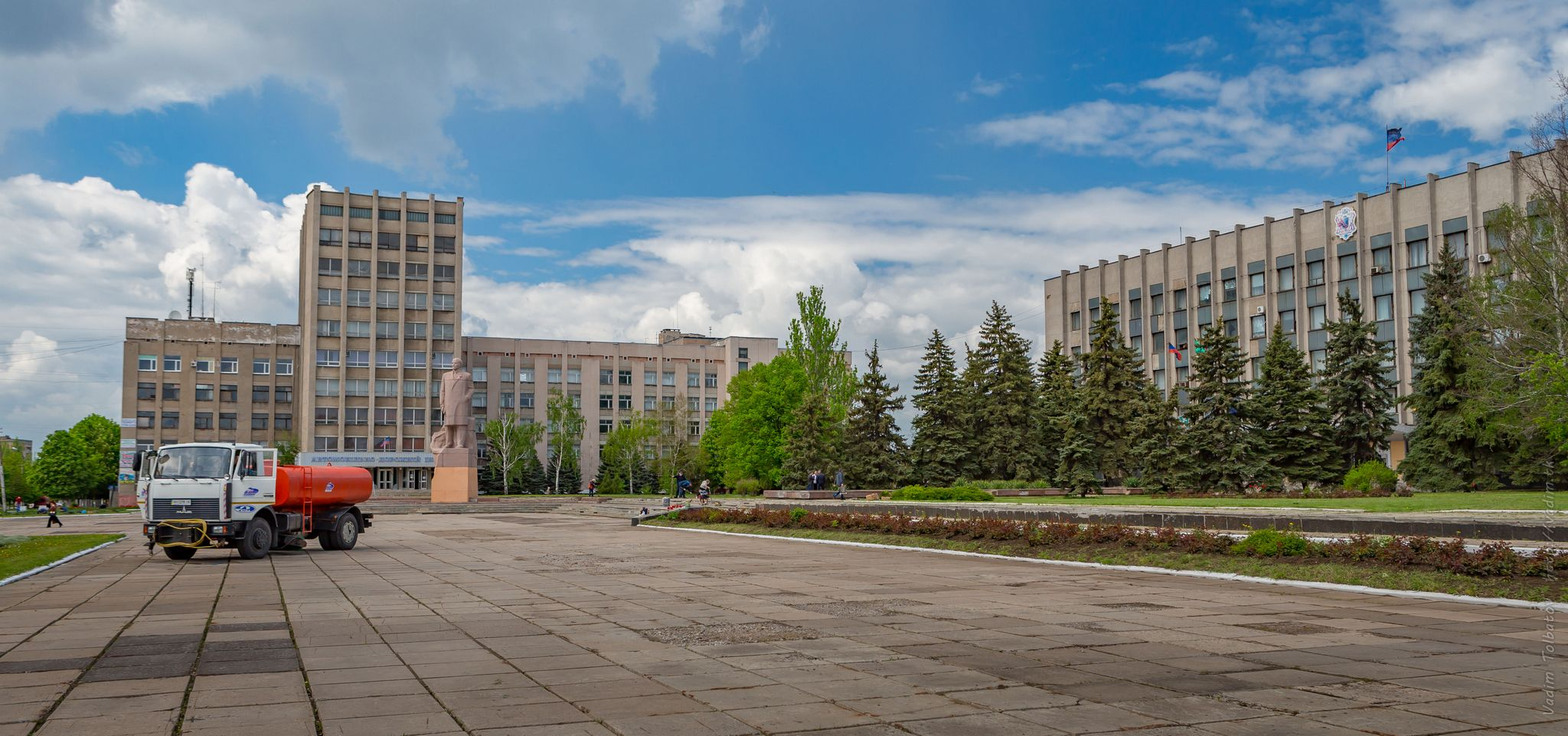
Lenin Square, Horlivka, 2016.

The city is divided into three urban districts:

- Kalininskyi (de jure since 2026 Kindrativskyi);
- Mykytivskyi;
- Tsentralno-Miskyi.

The city has Population Self-Organization Committees: six in the Mykytovskyi District, thirteen in the Kalininsky District, and ten in the Central City District. The city municipality also includes several towns and villages. Most of the populated places belong to the Tsentralno-Miskyi District, while Hladosove, Holmivskyi and Zaitseve are part of Mykytivskyi District.

== Industry ==
Coal Industry

- State-Owned Enterprise "Artemugol", which includes 4 coal mines.
- Filter Plant

Coal mining at the Artemugol mines has been suspended, and the enterprises are operating in environmental disaster prevention mode.

Machine-Building

- Horlivksyi Machine-Building Plant producing coal combines
- Novohorlivskyi Machine-Building Plant — drilling rigs, coal seam degassing machines, rock loading machines, and more. The company controls approximately 85% of the Ukrainian market for drilling equipment and surface mine mechanization equipment.
- Ore Repair Plant
- "Universal" — manufacture and overhaul of mechanized roof supports, tunneling machines, and other equipment for coal mines.
- Spetsvuhilliemash
- Automotive Repair Plant

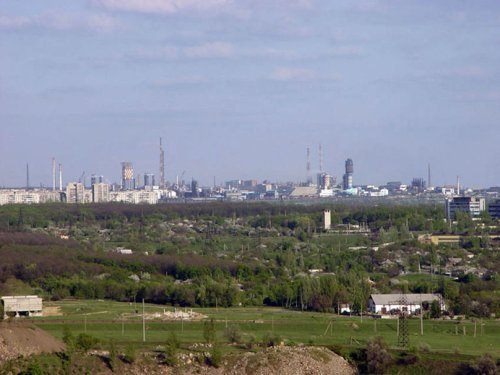
Stirol chemical plant in Horlivka

Chemical

- PJSC Concern Stirol — the largest (after CJSC Severodonetsk Azot Association) chemical enterprise in Ukraine
- Horlivka State-Owned Chemical Plant
- Elastomer Plant
- Tar Processing Plant

Coke and Chemical

- Horlivka Coke and Chemical Plant

Light

- Garment Factory "Horlivchanka" — previously specialized in lightweight women's dresses. In the early 2000s, it produced complex women's jackets and trousers at the request of an American originally from Odesa. In 2005, the company went bankrupt.
- knitwear factory

Food

- meat processing plants: PJSC "Horlivka Meat-Processing Plant" TM "Shchyryi Kum"; First Horlivka Meat-Processing Plant LLC
- Dairy Plant
- Mykytivskyi Bakery Plant
- Horlivka Bakery Plant
- Konti Confectionery Factory

Mining Industry

- Mykytivskyi Mercury Plant (not in operation). Mykytrtut LLC, a company created on its site, is still in operation.
- Mykytivskyi Refractory Plant LLC (declared bankrupt in 2005; all equipment has now been removed and most of the workshops are in disrepair).
- PJSC Panteleimonivskyi Refractory Plant, one of the largest magnesite refractory producers in Ukraine, became part of the Magnezit Group in January 2012.

Woodworking Industry

Electric Power

- The Donbas Electric Power System (DPS) of the National Energy Company (NEC) "Ukrenergo" (formerly PEO "Donbasenergo"), whose dispatch control area includes the Donetsk Oblast and Luhansk Oblast. The length of the Donbas ES's own single-circuit transmission lines is 4,095.6 km. The DPS operates 29 220-750 kV substations.

Of the total number of people employed in the national economy, approximately 40% work in industry.

== Transportation ==
=== Buses ===
The city of Horlivka has an extensive network of bus routes connecting the city's main districts, suburban communities, and industrial zones. Buses serve both the central parts of the city and outlying areas, such as the villages of Zaitseve, Mykhailivka, and Holmivskyi.

==== Tram ====
The tram, launched in Horlivka on November 7, 1932, has three routes:

- 1 — Railway Station — Lenin Mine;
- 7 — Quarter 245 — Shterovka Settlement;
- 8 — Kalinina Mine — Quarter 245.

==== Trolleybus ====
The trolleybus, launched in Horlivka on November 6, 1974, has four routes:

- 1 — Mykytivka Station — Altair JSC;
- 2 — Budivnyk Residential Area — Soniachnyi Residential Area;
- 3 — Budivnyk Residential Area — Novohorlivka;
- 4 — Budivnyk Residential Area — Mykytivka Station

=== Rail Transport ===
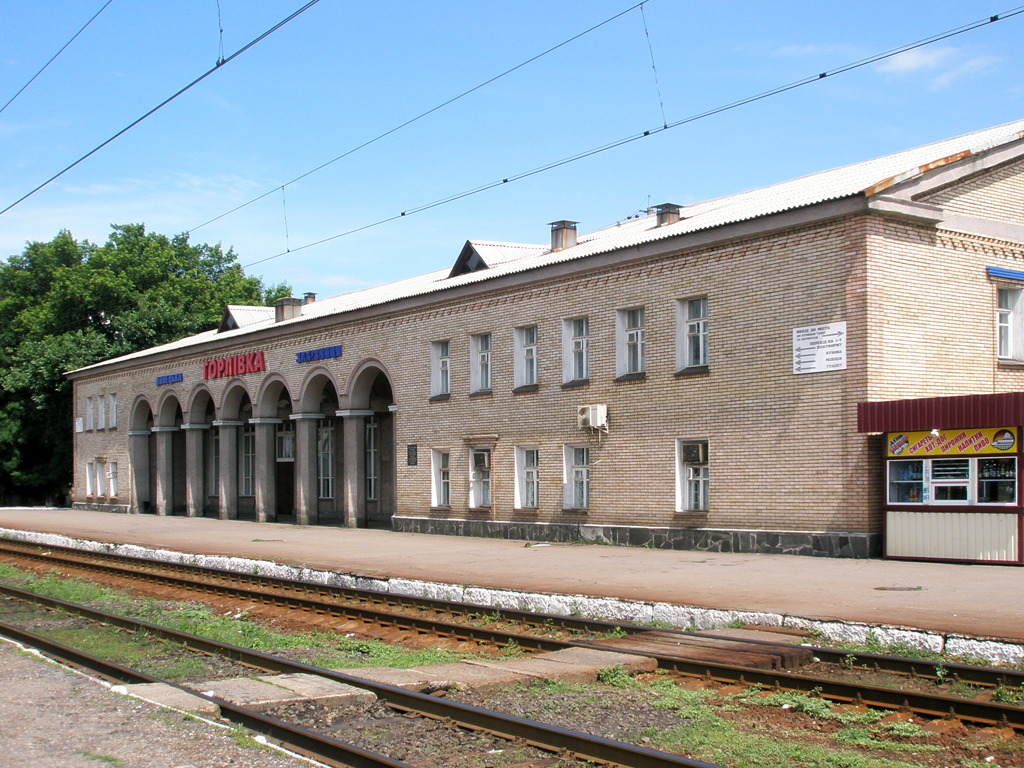
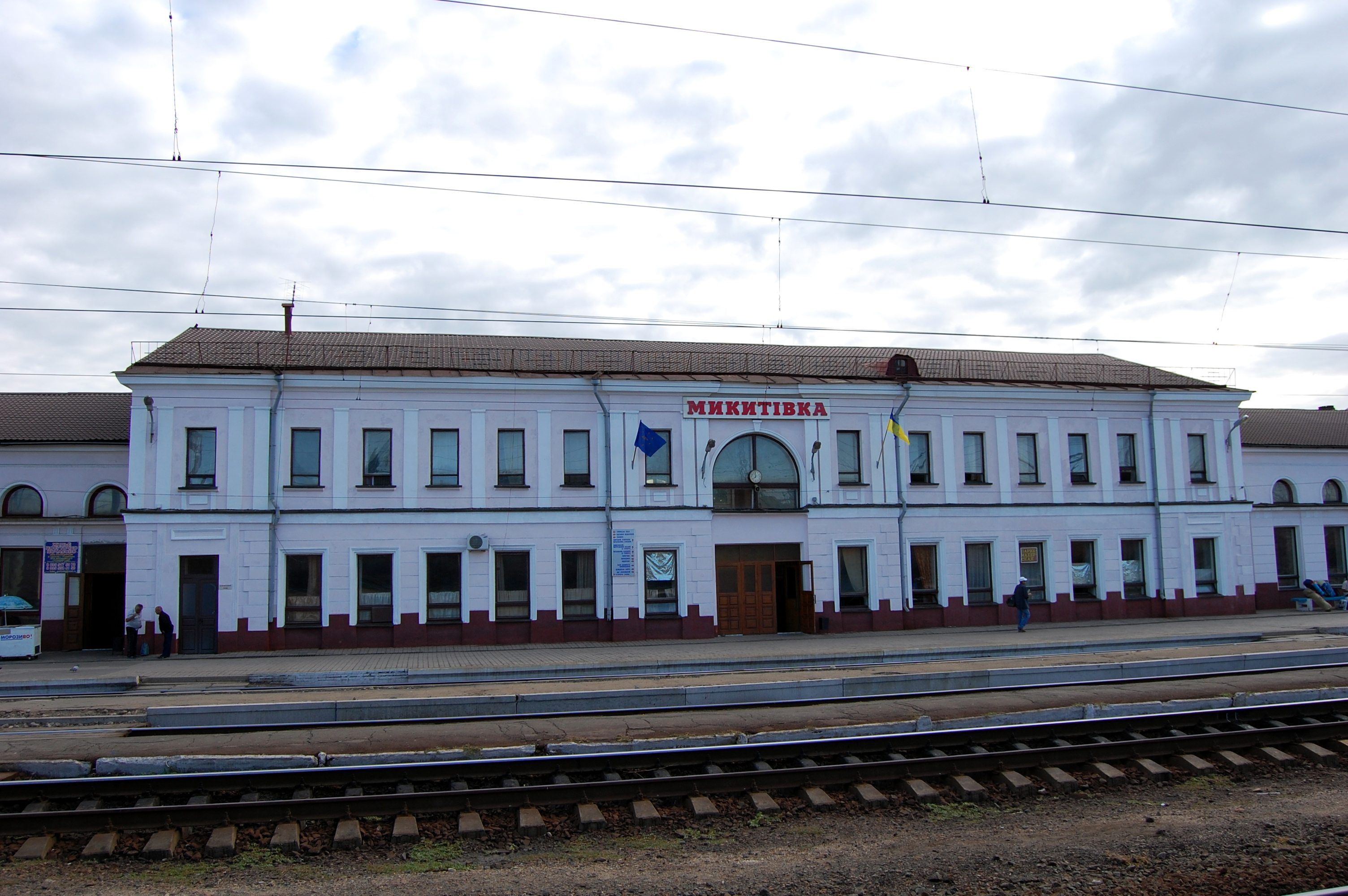
Horlivka and Mykytivka railway stations

Railway Junction. There are seven railway stations within the city: Mykytivka, Horlivka, Trudova, Bairak, Terykonna, Maiorska, Panteleimonivka.

== Finance ==
The city's budget revenue in 2004 was UAH 57,960,000, including UAH 20,232,800 in subsidies from the state budget of Ukraine. The Horlivka city budget in 1976 was RUB 32.0 million, including RUB 15.0 million in healthcare and RUB 10.7 million in education.

Exports of goods in 2003 amounted to $257.7 million. Foreign direct investment in 2003 amounted to $4.8 million. The volume of services produced in 2003 amounted to UAH 76.8 million. The unemployment rate was 2.8%. The average monthly salary in 2011 was UAH 1,500–2,500.

== Education ==
Professional education is represented by:

- higher education institutions:

- DonNTU Automobile and Road Institute,
- Horlivka Institute for Foreign Languages,

- technical schools:

- Horlivka Motor Transport Technical School,
- Horlivka Technical School of the Food Industry,
- Horlivka Technical School of Donetsk National University,
- Horlivka Housing and Public Utilities Technical School,
- Horlivka Mechanical Engineering College,
- Horlivka Medical College;
- Horlivka College of Industrial Technology
- Horlivka College of Technology and Service

- vocational educational institutions:

- Horlivka Vocational Lyceum of the Service Sector,
- Horlivka Vocational Lyceum,
- Horlivka Vocational Lyceum of Construction,
- Horlivka Vocational School No. 37,
- Horlivka Vocational Lyceum of Construction Mechanization,
- Horlivka Vocational School No. 88,
- Horlivka Vocational Lyceum of the Service and Trade Sector,
- Horlivka Vocational Mining Lyceum.

As of 2014, there are 58 schools and 57 kindergartens in the city.

== Culture ==
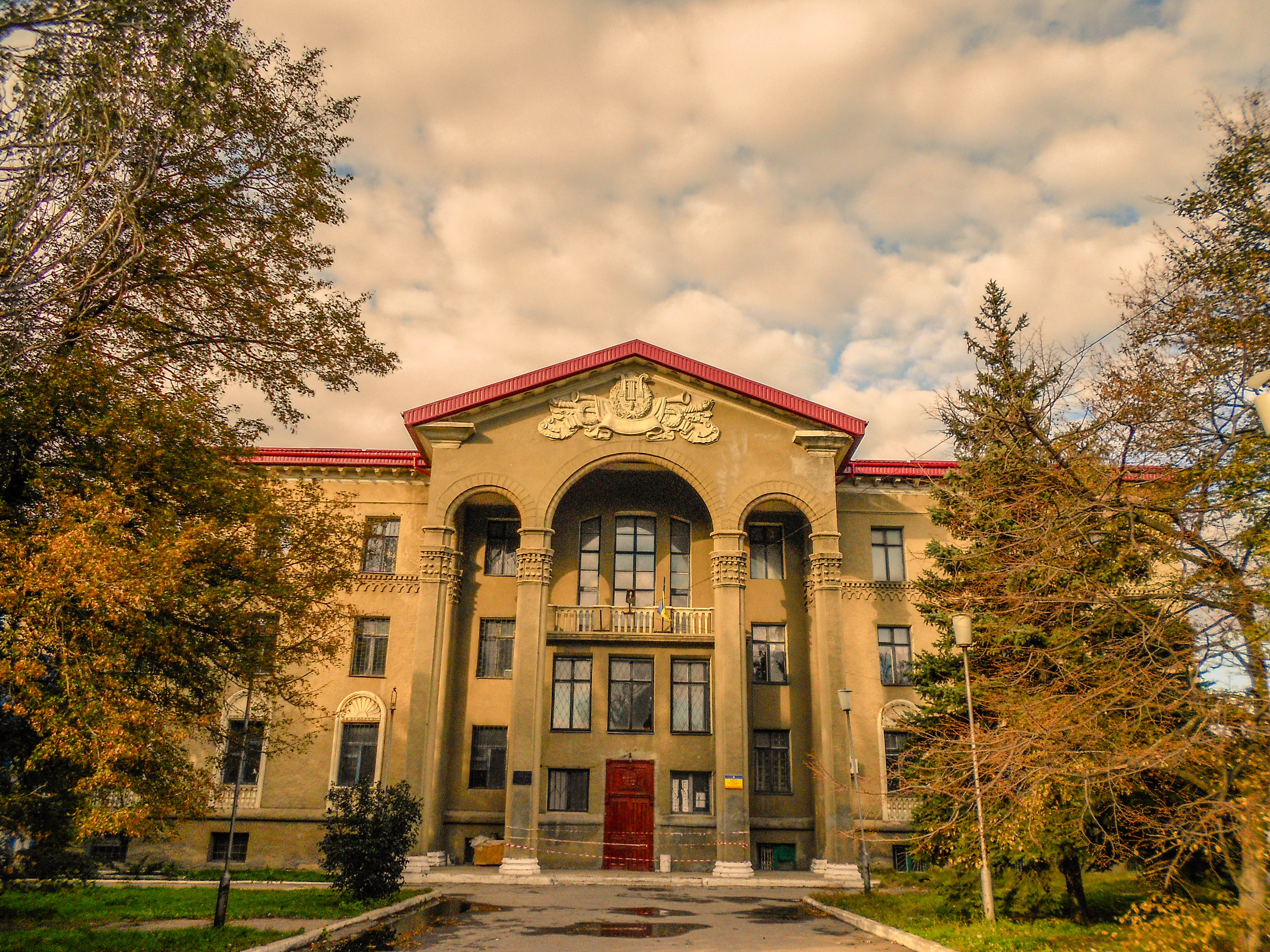
Lenin Palace of Culture.

The city has History Museum, Horlivka Art Museum (the largest collection of N.K. Roerich paintings in Ukraine), Razumov Museum of Miniature Books (the only state-owned museum in the world). 62 of 84 comprehensive schools (29,700 students, 7,000 teachers), 55 kindergartens (5,700 children), 19 of 25 community centers and clubs, 7 parks, 29 libraries, and 7 cinemas.

There are two literary associations in Horlivka, both of which emerged from the same literary group (formed around 1923, based on the proletarian writers' union "Zaboy"). After a split in the early 1990s, the literary groups no longer united. The larger literary association, "Zaboy," has over 45 members. "Zaboy" is a public organization that has published the annual almanac "Voskhozhdenie" ("Ascent") since 1994.

In the 1920s, a theater studio was founded, which over the years grew into a city theater. Since the 1960s, the Horlivka City Folk Theater "Yunist" has been organized in the Lenin Palace of Culture.

The members of the rock trio Fontaliza, who opened for the band Okean Elzy during the final concert dedicated to the band's 20th anniversary, are from Horlivka.

In May 1977, Vladimir Vysotski performed in Horlivka. This fact is mentioned in his biography from the series "The Lives of Remarkable People" by Vladimir Novikov.

== Notable people ==
- Viktor Arefyev (born 1975), Ukrainian football forward
- Sergei Baranov, Russian volleyball player
- Yuriy Boyko, Ukrainian politician
- Valeriy Horbunov, Ukrainian and Soviet football player
- Jinjer, Ukrainian metal band
- Nikolai Kapustin, Russian composer and pianist
- Alevtin Osipov, former Kazakh professional football player
- Ihor Petrov, Ukrainian professional football coach and a former player
- Aleksandr Ponomarev, Soviet Ukrainian football player and manager
- Ruslan Ponomariov, Ukrainian chess player
- Serhii Rebrov, Ukrainian football manager and former footballer
- Volodymyr Ivanovych Rybak, Ukrainian police officer and deputy, killed by Russian-backed militants
- Oleksandr Savanchuk, Ukrainian football striker
- Arkady Shevchenko, Soviet defector
- Mykyta Shevchenko, Ukrainian football goalkeeper
- Evgeny Ukhanov, Ukrainian-Australian pianist
- Alexander Volkov, Soviet-Ukrainian-Russian cosmonaut

== International relations ==
Horlivka is twinned with:

- Barnsley, United Kingdom, since 1987
- Pensacola, United States
- Buffalo, United States, since 2007

== Gallery ==
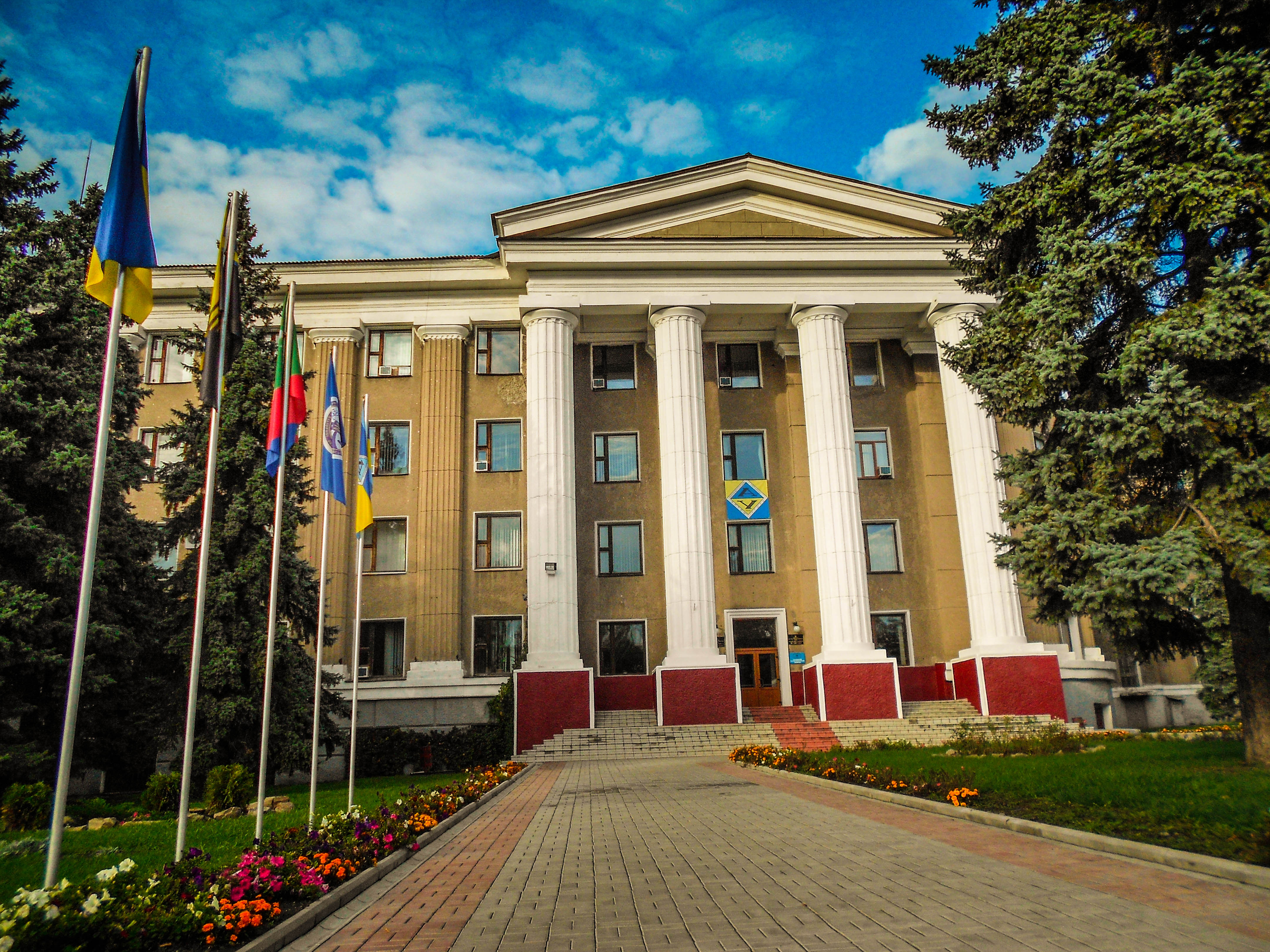
Seat of Artemvuhillia coal mining company

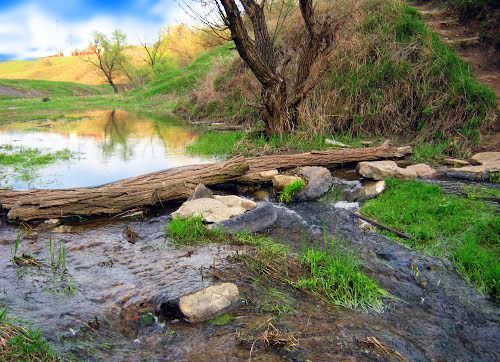
Zalizna Balka near Horlivka
