= Holmivskyi =

Urban locality in Donetsk Oblast, Ukraine

Holmivskyi Гольмівський
- Rural settlement
- Location of Holmivskyi within Ukraine Holmivskyi (Donetsk Oblast)
- Coordinates: 48°24′02″N 38°04′47″E
- Country: Ukraine
- Oblast: Donetsk Oblast
- Raion: Horlivka Raion
- Status: 1938

Area
  - Total: 8.572 km^{2} (3.310 sq mi)
- Elevation: 203 m (666 ft)

Population (2022)
  - Total: 6,750
  - Density: 787/km^{2} (2,040/sq mi)
- Time zone: UTC+2 (EET)
  - Summer (DST): UTC+3 (EEST)
- Postal code: 84691
- Area code: +380 6242

Holmivskyi (Ukrainian: Гольмівський; Russian: Го́льмовский, romanized: Golmovsky) is a rural settlement in eastern Ukraine, located in Horlivka municipality of Horlivka Raion in Donetsk Oblast, at 50.9 km (31.6 mi) NNE from the centre of Donetsk. The Population has been estimated as 6,750 (2022 estimate).

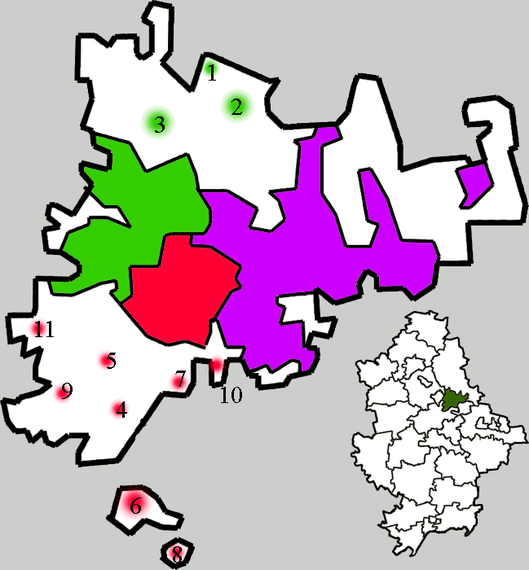
Administrative system of Horlivka: Districts of Horlivka: Kalinin Mykytivka Raion City Center / Populated places: 1 — Hladosove; 2 — Holmivskiy; 3 — Zaitseve; 4 — Mykhailivka; 5 — Ozeryanivka; 6 — Panteleymonivka; 7 — Piatykhatky; 8— Ryasne; 9 — Stavky; 10 — Fedorivka; 11 — Shyroka Balka

== Demographics ==
In 2001 the settlement had 7737 inhabitants. Native language as of the Ukrainian Census of 2001:

- Ukrainian — 51.79%
- Russian — 47.86%
- Belarusian — 0.09%
- Armenian — 0.05%
- Moldovan — 0.03%
- Romanian and Slovak — 0.01%

== Notable people ==
- Kirill Stremousov (1976–2022), Ukrainian separatist politician
