= Zaytsevo, Arkhangelsk Oblast =

Zaytsevo Зайцево
- Village
- Location within Arkhangelsk Oblast Location within Russia
- Coordinates: 62°56′N 46°25′E
- Country: Russia
- Region: Arkhangelsk Oblast
- District: Verkhnetoyemsky District
- Time zone: UTC+3:00

Zaytsevo (Russian: Зайцево) is a rural locality (a village) in Verkhnetoyemsky District, Arkhangelsk Oblast, Russia. The population was 7 as of 2010.

== Geography ==
Zaytsevo is located on the Vya River, 195 km northeast of Verkhnyaya Toyma (the district's administrative centre) by road. Yeskino is the nearest rural locality.
