= Zaytsevo, Belgorod Oblast =

Zaytsevo Зайцево
- Khutor
- Location within Belgorod Oblast Location within Russia
- Coordinates: 51°01′N 37°22′E
- Country: Russia
- Region: Belgorod Oblast
- District: Gubkinsky District
- Time zone: UTC+3:00

Zaytsevo (Russian: Зайцево) is a rural locality (a khutor) in Gubkinsky District, Belgorod Oblast, Russia. The population was 91 as of 2010. There are 3 streets.

== Geography ==
Zaytsevo is located 46 km southwest of Gubkin (the district's administrative centre) by road. Yuryevka is the nearest rural locality.
