= Travneve =

Travneve Травневе
- Location of Travneve within Ukraine Travneve (Ukraine)
- Coordinates: 48.424167°N 38.098889°E
- Country: Ukraine
- Oblast: Donetsk Oblast
- District: Bakhmut Raion

Area
  - Total: 0.917 km^{2} (0.354 sq mi)
- Elevation: 189 m (620 ft)

Population (2001 census)
  - Total: 286
  - Density: 312/km^{2} (808/sq mi)
- Time zone: UTC+2 (EET)
  - Summer (DST): UTC+3 (EEST)
- Postal code: 84500
- Area code: +380 6473

Travneve (Ukrainian: Травневе; Russian: Травневое) is a rural settlement in Bakhmut Raion (district) in Donetsk Oblast of eastern Ukraine, at about 50 km NNE from the centre of Donetsk city.

The settlement was taken under control of pro-Russian forces during the War in Donbass, that started in 2014. Ukrainian troops took the settlement under their control in November 2017. Power supply to Travneve (and Hladosove) was completely restored on 28 December 2017.

Travneve was reportedly captured by the Donetsk People's Republic on 5 August 2022, during the Eastern Ukraine offensive of the 2022 Russian invasion of Ukraine.

== Demographics ==
In 2001 the settlement had 286 inhabitants. Native language distribution as of the Ukrainian Census of 2001:

- Ukrainian: 30.42%
- Russian: 69.58%
