= Zaytsevo, Syamzhensky District, Vologda Oblast =

Zaytsevo Зайцево
- Village
- Location within Vologda Oblast Location within Russia
- Coordinates: 59°59′N 41°36′E
- Country: Russia
- Region: Vologda Oblast
- District: Syamzhensky District
- Time zone: UTC+3:00

Zaytsevo (Russian: Зайцево) is a rural locality (a village) in Korobitsynskoye Rural Settlement, Syamzhensky District, Vologda Oblast, Russia. The population was 24 as of 2002.

== Geography ==
Zaytsevo is located 42 km southeast of Syamzha (the district's administrative centre) by road. Pestino is the nearest rural locality.
