= Zaytsevo, Republic of Bashkortostan =

Zaytsevo Зайцево
- Selo
- Location within Bashkortostan Location within Russia
- Coordinates: 56°05′N 54°56′E
- Country: Russia
- Region: Bashkortostan
- District: Yanaulsky District
- Time zone: UTC+5:00

Zaytsevo (Russian: Зайцево) is a rural locality (a selo) in Pevomaysky Selsoviet, Yanaulsky District, Bashkortostan, Russia. The population was 315 as of 2010. There are 7 streets.

== Geography ==
Zaytsevo is located 20 km south of Yanaul (the district's administrative centre) by road. Cheraul is the nearest rural locality.
