= Zaytsevo, Ustyuzhensky District, Vologda Oblast =

Zaytsevo Зайцево
- Village
- Location within Vologda Oblast Location within Russia
- Coordinates: 58°48′N 36°18′E
- Country: Russia
- Region: Vologda Oblast
- District: Ustyuzhensky District
- Time zone: UTC+3:00

Zaytsevo (Russian: Зайцево) is a rural locality (a village) in Ustyuzhenskoye Rural Settlement, Ustyuzhensky District, Vologda Oblast, Russia. The population was 5 as of 2002.

== Geography ==
Zaytsevo is located 10 km (6.2 mi) southwest of Ustyuzhna (the district's administrative centre) by road. Terentyevo is the nearest rural locality.
