= Horlivka Institute for Foreign Languages =

Horlivka Institute for Foreign Languages HSEE «Donbas State Pedagogical University»
- Горлівський Інститут іноземних мов “Донбаський державний педагогічний університет”
- Motto: Scientia et Diligetia (Latin)
- Chancellor: Prof., Ph.D. Viktor Dokashenko
- Students: 2000 in full-time tuition, 500 in tuition by correspondence
- Location: Horlivka/Dnipro, Ukraine; 48°18′15″N 38°01′05″E
- Website: www.forlan.org.ua
- Location within Ukraine

The Horlivka Institute for Foreign Languages (part of Donbas State Pedagogical University) is an institute of higher education originally located in Horlivka, Ukraine. After the outbreak of the Russo-Ukrainian War, the institute was evacuated and releocated to Bakhmut. Upon the 2022 Russian invasion of Ukraine, the institute was again moved, this time from Bakhmut to Dnipro, where it is housed at the Oles Honchar Dnipro National University.

== History ==
In autumn 1949 the Pedagogical Institute for Foreign Languages was created on the basis of Bilotserkivsky teacher training college. In the academic year 1953-1954 Bilotserkivskiy Pedagogical Institute for Foreign Languages was organized.

In September 1954, Bilotserkivskiy Pedagogical Institute for Foreign Languages was transferred from the city of Bila Tserkva, Kyiv oblast, to Horlivka, Donetsk region and named Horlivka Pedagogical Institute for Foreign Languages, which was the first higher education institution in the city.

In July 1963 the sports camp started its activity. It could admit 50 students. In the late 70's Horlivka State Pedagogical Institute for Foreign Languages started two teachers’ training programmes in the fields of the English and French languages with the German language as the second. The term of studying was 5 years. Developing Horlivka State Pedagogical Institute for Foreign Languages was held under the leadership of respected and talented personalities in Arts and History Shvachko Karpo (rector in 1953–1975), Ph.D., Associate Professor Ivanenko Galyna (rector in 1975–1982), Candidate of Historical Sciences, Professor Klitsakov Ivan Oleksiyovych (Rector in 1982–2001). In 2001 professor, Doctor of Historical Sciences - Dokashenko Viktor Mykolayovych was elected as a rector of the institute. Since 2012, the institute has become part of the Donbas State Pedagogical University as a separate unit "Horlivka Institute for Foreign Languages."

After April 2014 (following the outbreak of the war in Donbas), the institute found itself in self-proclaimed Donetsk People's Republic. Ukrainian authorities re-opened the institute in Bakhmut. In 2022, after the Russian invasion of Ukraine, the institute was again relocated, this time to the city of Dnipro, where it is housed in the Oles Honchar Dnipro National University.

== Campuses and buildings ==
The institute has 6 academic buildings: Academic buildings 1-2 are for the students of the English Language Faculty. Besides the classrooms you can find here computer labs, phonetic laboratories, teaching studies. On the same premises there are sports complex, a library, a publishing center and an assembly hall. Academic building 3 has 19 classrooms for the students of The Humanitarian faculty. Students from the French and German Languages Department have classes in academic building 4, which has 38 classrooms and a computer class. Translator's faculty is situated in the academic building 5, which contains 17 classes, a computer laboratory and an assembly hall. Students from the Slavonic and Germanic Languages Faculty study Ukrainian, Russian and English in academic building 6 with its 32 classrooms and a computer class. In future the Institute plans to put into operation 2 more academic buildings and a new building for the library. The institute offers 4 dormitories for the non-residents of Horlivka.

The institute also has a sports camp "Altair", located in Schurove in Donetsk Oblast's Lyman Raion.

== Institutes and faculties ==
- The Faculty of the English Language
- The French and German Languages Faculty
- The Humanitarian Faculty
- Translator's Faculty
- The Slavonic and Germanic Languages Faculty
- Educational-research center of pre-diploma

== Honorary Doctors and highschool graduates ==
- Viktoria Davydova, 1989 year alumni. Press and Information Counsellor at the Ukrainian Delegation to EU (Brussels).
- Svitlana Shytikova, 1995 year alumni. Head of the Council of the Institute for Leadership, Innovations and Advancement, Member of the Board of Directors of the Global Development Study Center, Director of the TEMPUS-office in Ukraine.
