= Zaitseve, Luhansk Oblast =

Zaitseve Зайцеве Іллічівка
- Village
- Location of Zaitseve within Ukraine Zaitseve (Ukraine)
- Coordinates: 49.933889°N 38.4425°E
- Country: Ukraine
- Oblast: Luhansk Oblast
- Raion: Troitske Raion
- Founded: 1959

Area
  - Total: 11.7 km^{2} (4.5 sq mi)
- Elevation: 170 m (560 ft)

Population (2001 census)
  - Total: 235
  - Density: 20.1/km^{2} (52.0/sq mi)
- Time zone: UTC+2 (EET)
  - Summer (DST): UTC+3 (EEST)
- Postal code: 92112
- Area code: +380 6456

Zaitseve (Ukrainian: Зайцеве; Russian: Зайцево) is a village in Svatove Raion (district) in Luhansk Oblast of eastern Ukraine, at about 60 km NNW from the centre of Luhansk.

== Demographics ==
In 2001 the settlement had 235 inhabitants. Native language as of the Ukrainian Census of 2001:

- Ukrainian — 88.09%
- Russian — 11.91%
