= Hladosove =

Hladosove Гладосове
- Interactive map of Hladosove
- Location of Hladosove within Ukraine Hladosove (Ukraine)
- Coordinates: 48°25′54″N 38°4′13″E
- Country: Ukraine
- Oblast: Donetsk Oblast
- Raion: Bakhmut Raion
- Hromada: Svitlodarsk urban hromada

Population (2001 census)
  - Total: 121
- Time zone: UTC+2 (EET)
  - Summer (DST): UTC+3 (EEST)
- Postal code: 84691
- Area code: +380 6242

Hladosove (Ukrainian: Гладосове; Russian: Гладосово) is a rural-type settlement in Svitlodarsk urban hromada, Bakhmut Raion, Donetsk Oblast of eastern Ukraine, at 61.1 km NNE from the centre of Donetsk city.

== History ==
The settlement was taken under control by pro-Russian forces during the war in Donbas that started in 2014. Ukrainian troops retook Hladosove in November 2017, together with nearby Travneve. Power supply to Hladosove (and Travneve) was completely restored on 28 December 2017. On 28 May 2019, due to the fact that, since its recapture by Ukraine, Hladosove had been effectively severed from the administrative structure of Horlivka Municipality which it legally belonged to, the Ukrainian government decided to change its administrative status. Hladosove was thus transferred to Bakhmut Raion, increasing the size of the raion by 71.7 hectares.

During the Russian invasion of Ukraine, the Donetsk People's Republic claimed to have captured Hladosove on 10 August 2022.

== Demographics ==
Native language as of the Ukrainian Census of 2001:

- Ukrainian 81.82%
- Russian 18.18%
