= Ozerianivka =

Ozerianivka Озерянівка
- Location of Ozerianivka within Ukraine
- Coordinates: 48°16′17″N 37°58′22″E
- Country: Ukraine
- Oblast: Donetsk Oblast
- Elevation: 211 m (692 ft)

Population (2001 census)
  - Total: 1,154
- Time zone: UTC+2 (EET)
  - Summer (DST): UTC+3 (EEST)
- Postal code: 84693
- Area code: +380 6242

Ozerianivka (Ukrainian: Озерянівка; Russian: Озеряновка, romanized: Ozeryanovka) is a rural settlement in Donetsk Oblast, eastern Ukraine, 41.8 kilometres (26.0 mi) NNE from the centre of Donetsk city.

== History ==
On 17 October 2014, amid the war in Donbas, pro-Russian militants attempted to storm the Ukrainian government position near Ozerianivka, but were repulsed with no Ukrainian casualties. On 3 November 2014, there was another unsuccessful attempt to take positions near the village by the militants, with assistance from a tank firing from Horlivka. The Ukrainian military reported they had killed four militants and captured another. However, the settlement itself was taken by the militants during the war.

== Demographics ==
In the 2001 Ukrainian census, it was found that the settlement was majority natively Russian-speaking (66.12%), with a large minority of native Ukrainian speakers (31.98%). There were also small minorities of native speakers of Belarusian (1.30%), Armenian (0.35%), and Moldovan (0.09%).
