= List of deaths during the Russo-Ukrainian war (2022–present) =

Many notable Ukrainians, Russians and other nationals died during the Russo-Ukrainian war since the 2022 Russian invasion of Ukraine, either while serving in the armed forces or as civilian casualties.

Those proven to have died as a result of the war include:

== Ukrainian military ==
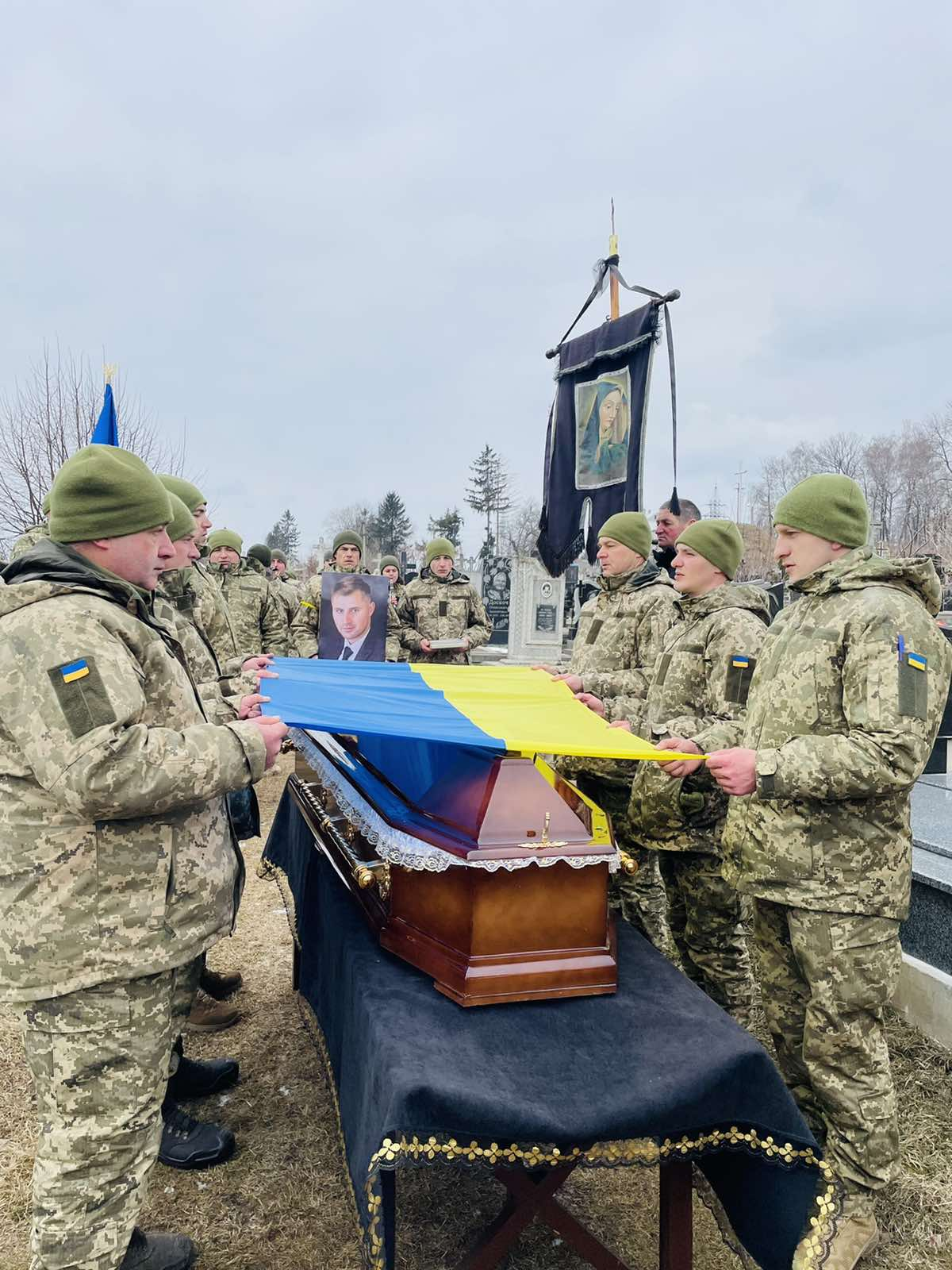
Funeral of Captain Oleksandr Korpan on 7 March 2022

=== 2022 ===
- On 24 February, Vitalii Skakun, a combat engineer, died during the Kherson offensive, reportedly sacrificing himself to ensure the destruction of a bridge to slow the Russian army's advance.
- On 25 February, Colonel Oleksandr Oksanchenko deputy commander of flight training of the 831st Tactical Aviation Brigade, and display pilot on international airshows, died in the Battle of Kyiv.
- On 25 February, Iryna Tsvila, a Svoboda activist and soldier, was killed in Kyiv, along with her soldier husband.
- On 26 February, Inna Derusova, a military medic and nurse, was killed by enemy fire while taking care of wounded fellow soldiers in Okhtyrka, Sumy Oblast.
- On 1 March, Oleksandr Kulyk, an Olympic cycling coach, was killed in battle near Nyzy in Sumy Oblast.
- On 2 March, Captain Oleksandr Korpan was killed in Starokostiantyniv, Khmelnytskyi Oblast.

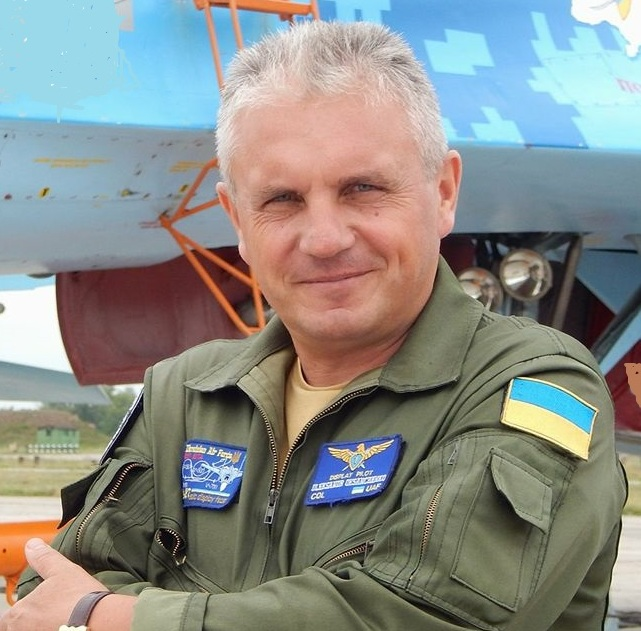
Col Oleksandr Oksachenko from 831st Tactical Aviation Brigade and winner of European Air shows.

- On 4 March, Valeriy Chybineyev, a sniper, was killed at the Battle of Antonov Airport.
- On 6 March, Pavlo Lee, an actor and member of the Territorial Defense Forces, was killed during the Kyiv offensive.
- On 7 March, Oleksandr Marchenko, a former member of the Verkhovna Rada and member of the Territorial Defense Forces was killed in a battle near Kyiv.
- On 8 March, Sergeant Kateryna Stupnytska from the 3rd Mechanised Battalion was killed in Kyiv. She was awarded with the Hero of Ukraine and the "Golden Star" Order.
- On 9 March, Colonel Serhiy Kotenko, Commander of the 9th Separate Motorized Infantry Battalion "Vinnytsia Scythians" was killed in battle near Zaporizhzhia.
- On 11 March, Major Oleh Chornomorets, a Naval officer, was killed.
- On 12 March, Colonel Dmytro Apukhtin, Deputy Commander of the 23rd Public Security Protection Brigade was killed near Mariupol during an attack by an enemy column.
- On 12 March, Colonel Valeriy Hudz, Commander of the 24th Mechanized Brigade was killed in Luhansk.
- On 13 March, Major Stepan Tarabalka, an Air Force pilot, was shot down and killed while fighting Russian forces. Tarabalka was hinted by Western media to be the Ghost of Kyiv.
- On 13 March, Aliaksiej Skoblia, a Belarusian volunteer and member of the Ukrainian Special Operations Forces and deputy Commander of the Kastuś Kalinoŭski Battalion was killed in an ambush in the outskirts of Kyiv.
- On 14 March, Mykola Kravchenko, a public and political figure, chief ideologue of Azov Battalion and the organization Patriot of Ukraine, was killed during the Battle of Kyiv.
- On 17 March, Col. Oleg Zenchenko Brigade Commander of the 25th Airborne Brigade was reported killed in combat in Donetsk Oblast.
- On 25 March, Senior lieutenant Maksym Kagal was killed during the Siege of Mariupol. He was a kickboxing athlete and world champion in the national team of Ukraine and was posthumously awarded as Hero of Ukraine.
- On 30 March, Col. Maksim Sikalenko, Brigade Commander of the 7th Tactical Aviation Brigade was killed while flying his Su-24 jetbomber during a combat mission.
- On 1 April, Yuriy Ruf, a poet, was killed while fighting Russian forces in Luhansk.
- On 7 April, Oleksii Yanin, former world kick-boxing champion, was killed in battle in Mariupol.
- On 20 April, Ivan Bidnyak, a silver medalist at the European Shooting Championships, was killed in action in Kherson Oblast.
- On 4 May, military journalist Oleksandr Makhov, died during the defense of the village of Dovhenke in Kharkiv Oblast.
- On 7 May, Colonel Ihor Bedzai, Commander of the 10th Naval Aviation Brigade, and deputy commander of the Ukrainian Navy, was killed by a missile from a Russian fighter jet while performing a combat mission in Odesa Oblast.
- On 28 May, Vitaly Derekh journalist, public activist and soldier was killed during the Battle of Bakhmut.

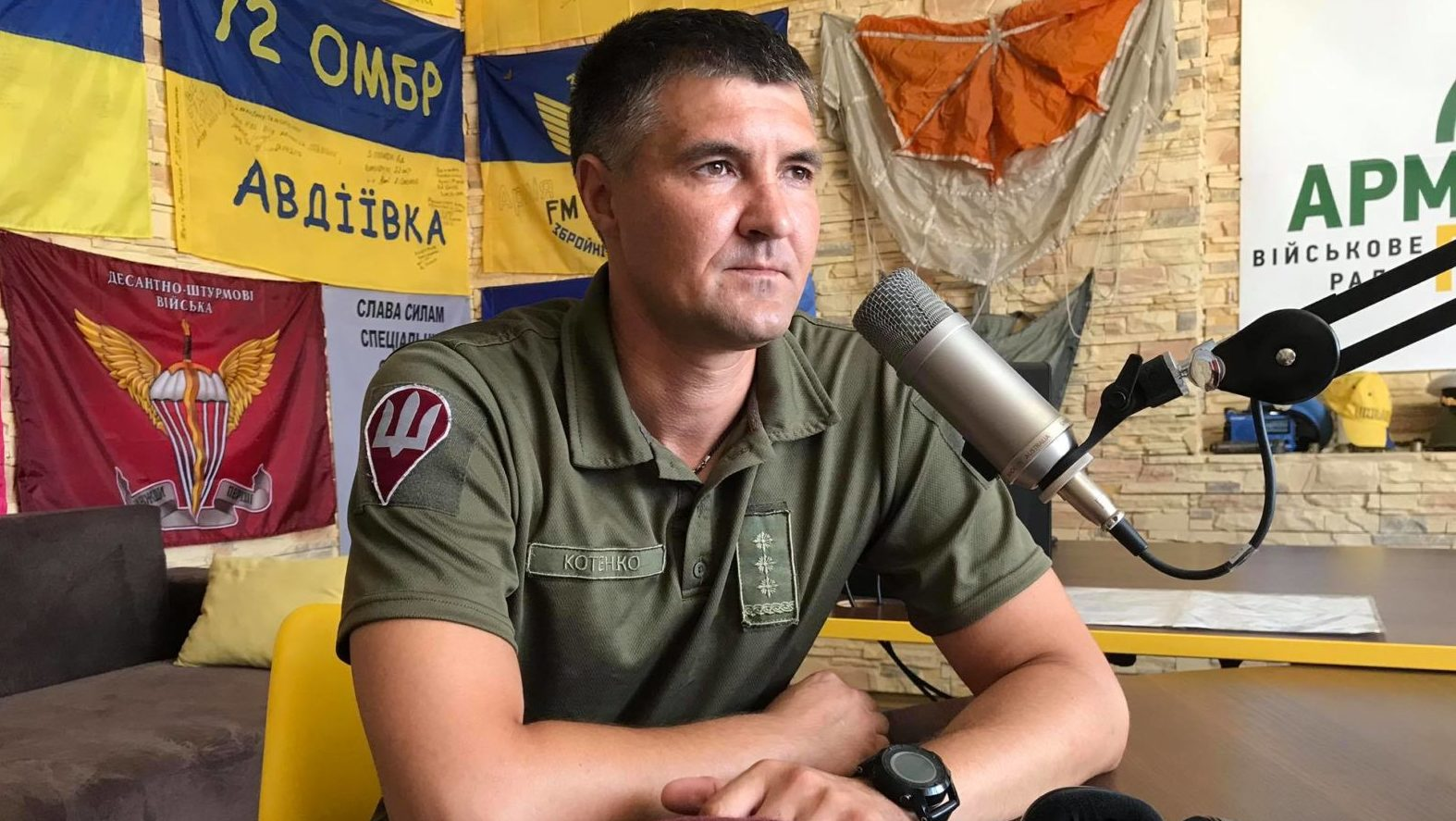
Br. Gen Artem Kotenko, Ukrainian General killed on 3 November 2022.

- On 5 June, Lt. Col Dmytro Fisher former Commander of the 831st Tactical Aviation Brigade was killed in Orikhiv, Zaporizhzhia Oblast when his Su-27 was shot down.
- On 9 June, Roman Ratushnyi, a Euromaidan activist and soldier, died during a battle near Izium.

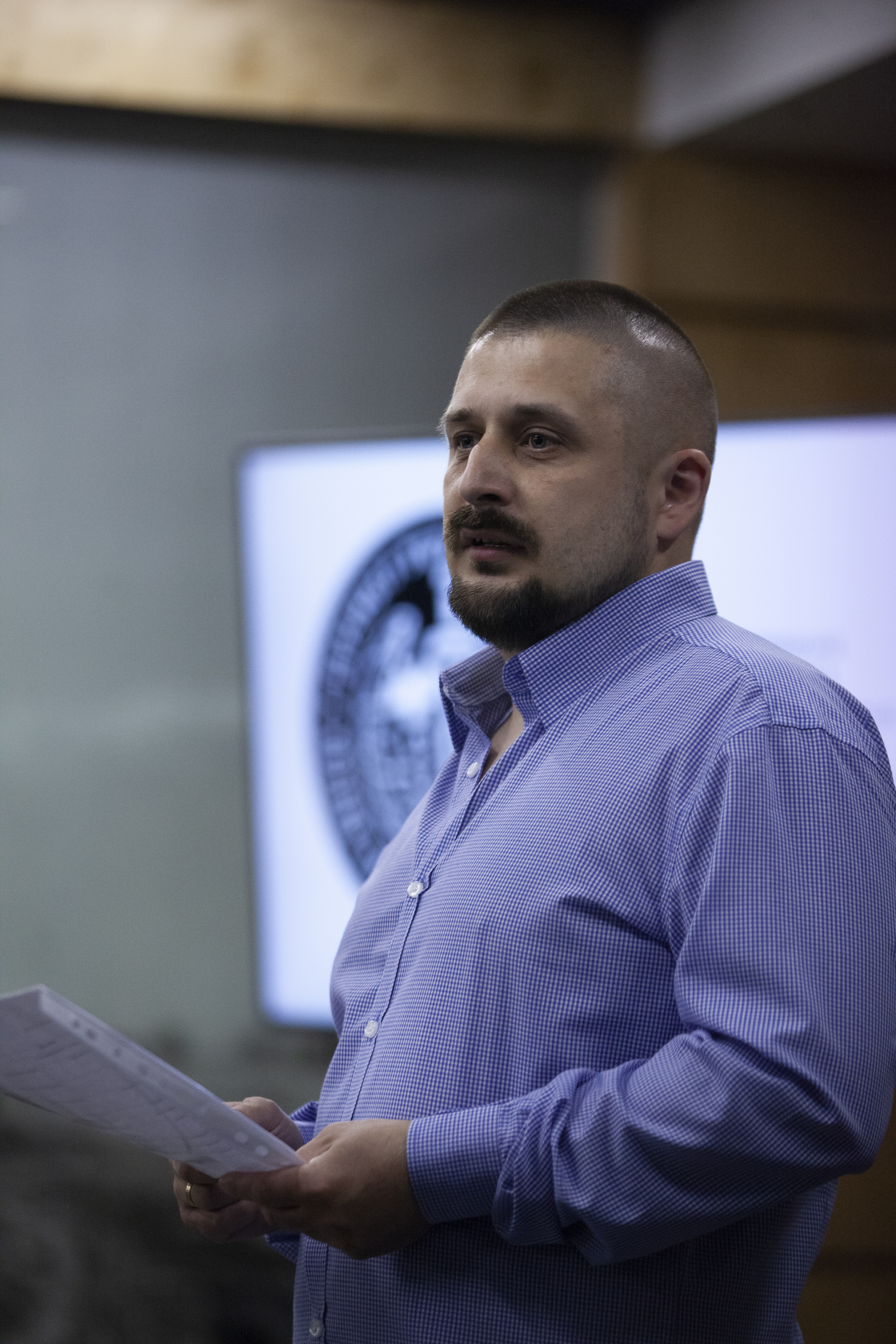
Chief ideologue and founder of Azov Battalion Mykola Kravchenko

- On 10 June, Oleksii Chubashev, acting head of the Central Television and Radio Studio of the Ministry of Defense of Ukraine, was killed.
- On 19 June, Oleh Kutsyn, former Deputy Head of Tiachiv, died during battle in Izium. He was the head of the "Legion of Freedom" of the Svoboda party as well as Commander of company Karpatska Sich of the 93rd Mechanized Brigade of the Armed Forces of Ukraine.
- On 26 June, the commander of the 40th Tactical Aviation Brigade, Colonel Mykhailo Matiushenko and Major Yurii Krasylnikov, were killed when their Su-24 was shot down by a Russian anti-aircraft missile over Snake Island in the Black Sea.
- On 12 July, Captain Yuriy Taran, Chief of Staff of a battalion of the 72nd Mechanized Brigade was killed in Toretsk.
- On 23 July, Colonel Vitaliy Hulyayev, Commander of the 28th Separate Mechanized Brigade was killed in Mykolaiv by an airstrike.
- On 26 July, Major Oleksandr Kukurba, chief of Intelligence at the HQ of the 299th Tactical Aviation Brigade of the Armed Forces of Ukraine.
- On 2 August, Colonel Oleg Degtyarev, Brigade Commander of the 66th Mechanized Brigade was killed in combat in Marinka.
- On 7 August, Major Anton Lystopad pilot and son of Major General Valentyn Lystopad Deputy Commander of the Ukrainian Air force, was killed during a mission.
- On 1 September, Dmytro Fialka, an Israeli-Ukrainian veteran of the 2006 Lebanon War, football coach, and Ukrainian Territorial Defense soldier was killed in Bakhmut.
- On 7 September, Serhii Balanchuk, a former football player for Dynamo Kyiv and the Ukrainian national football team, was killed by Russian artillery shelling near Bakhmut.

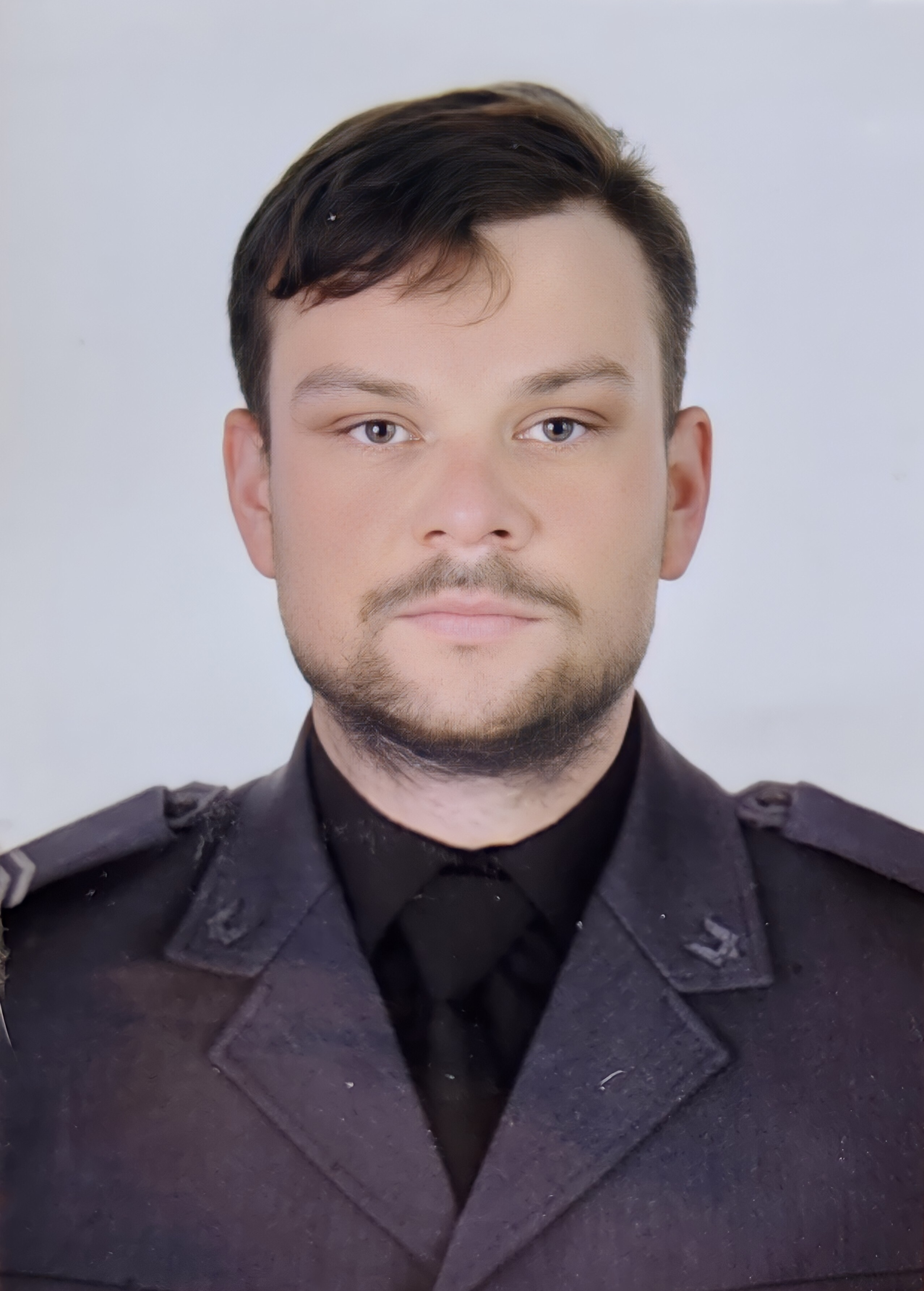
Aliaksiej Skoblia, Deputy Commander of Belarusian Kastuś Kalinoŭski Battalion killed in the battle of Kyiv

- On 12 September, Oleksandr Shapoval, a ballet dancer and choreographer at the National Opera of Ukraine was killed in a battle near Donetsk.
- On 27 September, Ablyatif Rustem, a political scientist and Crimean Tatar historian, died fighting against Russian troops in Kherson Oblast.
- On 28 September, Lieutenant Colonel Ihor Bezohlyuk, founder of the Legion for Ukraine died in Kharkiv when his vehicle was hit by a mine.
- On 2 November, Tseng Sheng-guang, a Taiwanese volunteer, was killed in battle near Kremina Luhansk Oblast.
- On 3 November, Brigadier-General Artem Kotenko, deputy commander of the Ukrainian Air Assault Forces, who had commanded the 46th and the 81st Airmobile Brigade and Colonel Volodymyr Oleksiyovych Levchuk, former Deputy Minister of Veteran's Affairs were killed by wounds received in Zhytomyr Oblast when their vehicle was hit by a mine. Kotenko was the first Ukrainian General to be reportedly killed in the war.
- On 11 November, Yevhen Kolesnichenko, a three-time national champion as part of Shakhtar Donetsk and player of the Ukrainian men's national handball team, was killed after being blown up by a mine in Bakhmut.
- On 13 November, Vadym Khlupianets, a ballet dancer at the Kyiv National Academic Theatre of Operetta and a soldier was killed by a sniper near Bakhmut.

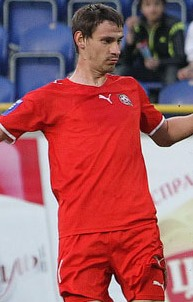
Serhiy Rozhok, a former professional footballer was killed in January 2024

- On 16 November, Serhii Mironov, a writer, historian and officer of the Territorial Defense of Ukraine was killed in Bakhmut.
- On 24 November, Captain Valerii Hliebov was killed in Soledar.
- On 20 December, Oleh Bobalo, a film director and soldier, was killed in Bakhmut.
- On 21 December, Oleh Rybalchenko, a journalist, public figure, and military officer was killed in Bakhmut.
- On 28 December, Yezhov Volodymyr Anatoliyovych, developer of S.T.A.L.K.E.R.: Clear Sky and Cossacks video game series, was reported killed in Bakhmut.
- On 31 December, Yevhen Hulevych philosopher and cultural historian, was killed during the battle of Bakhmut.

=== 2023 ===
- On 8 January, Colonel Yuryi Oleksandrovych Yurczyk, Chief of the Special Forces of the Ukrainian State Border Service, was killed in Soledar.
- On 15 January, Grygorii Tsekhmistrenko, a Canadian volunteer medic of Ukrainian origin, Euromaidan participant and member of the International Legion, was killed in Bakhmut.
- On 15 January, Taras Strakhiv, an athlete, was killed in Bakhmut.
- On 23 January, Dmytro Sharpar, a figure skater, was killed in Bakhmut.
- On 26 January, Eduard Lobau (Lobov), a Belarusian activist and volunteer of the Armed Forces of Ukraine was killed in Vuhledar.
- On 2 February, Andrii Fylypchuk, an archeologist, was killed.
- On 5 February, Ukrainian soldier Bogdan Borodai son of the Member of the Buchanski Civilian Council that denounced the killings of Bucha, was killed in Bakhmut.
- On 6 March, Major Andriy Lukanyuk, battalion commander in the 80th Air Assault Brigade and a veteran of the 2014 war, was killed by a Russian airstrike in Chasiv Yar.
- On 7 March, Dmytro Kotsiubailo, leader of the Right Sector paramilitary group, commander of the 1st Mechanized Battalion and 2021 recipient of the Hero of Ukraine, was killed in Bakhmut.
- On 28 March, Denys Kirilyuk, pilot and First Deputy Commander of a Squadron of the 831st Tactical Aviation Brigade, was killed when his Su-27 fighter aircraft was hit in the air by a Russian Shahed 136 (Geran-2) drone.
- On 31 March, Vitaly Merinov, four-time world champion in kickboxing, died during the battle of Bakhmut.

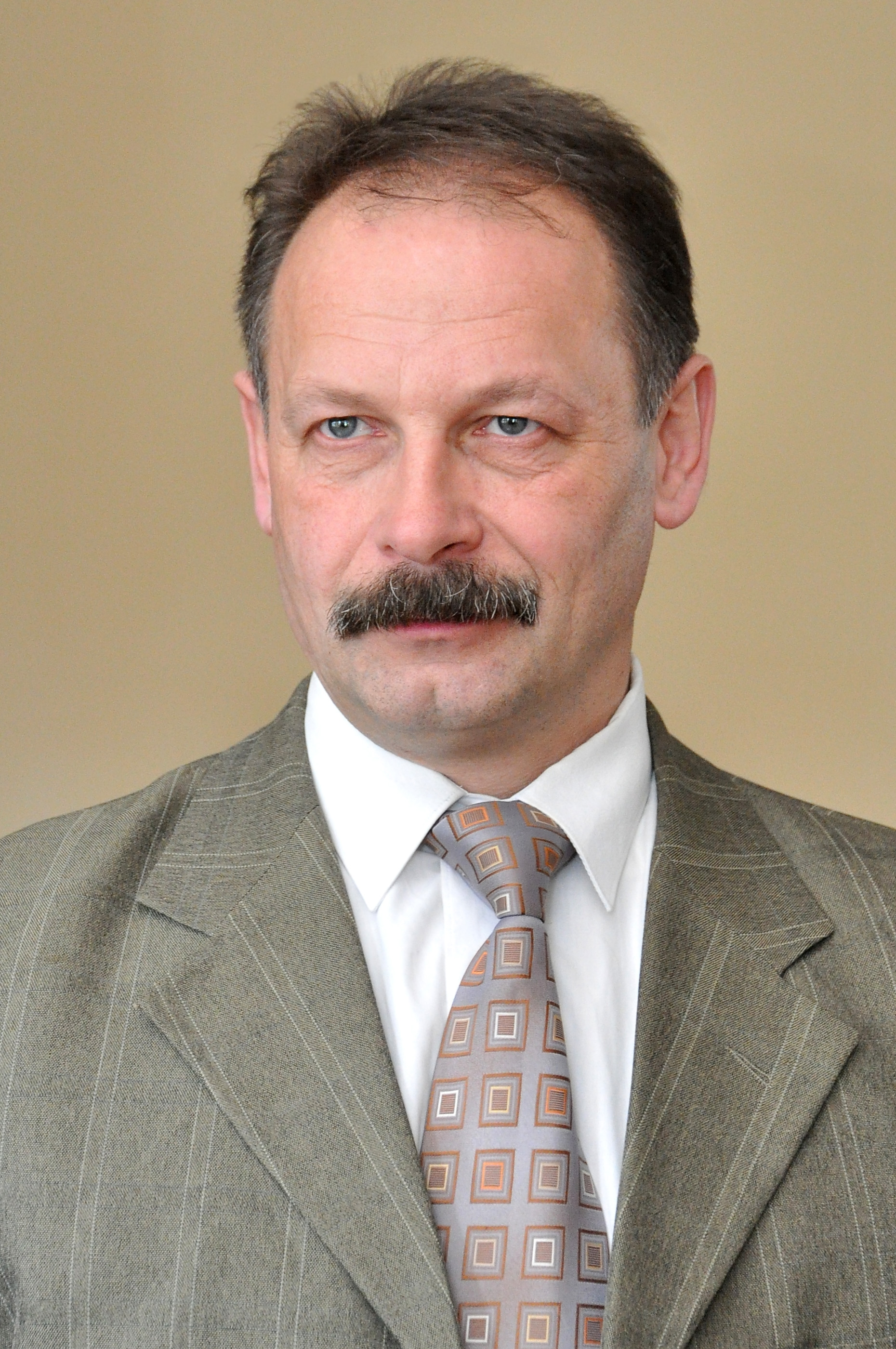
Ukrainian Parliamentarian Oleh Barna killed in Vuhledar

- On 1 April, Daniil Lyashuk, nicknamed "Mujahid", a Belarusian former leader of the Tornado Battalion, who had been imprisoned in Ukraine from 2017 to 2021 on counts of rape and torture of POWs in the first Donbas war, was killed in Bakhmut.
- On 17 April, Valerii Dorokhov, an entrepreneur, was killed.
- On 18 April, Oleh Barna, a former member of the Verkhovna Rada, was killed in Vuhledar.
- On 19 April, Finbar Cafferkey, an Irish political activist and volunteer, was killed in Bakhmut.
- On 19 April, Dmitry Petrov, a Russian anarchist activist and volunteer, was killed in Bakhmut.
- On 21 May, Yulian Matviychuk, a deputy of the Poltava City Council from the political party Svoboda, died in a hospital in Dnipro as a result of a severe wound received at the front.
- On 22 May, Yevheniy Osiyevsky, an anthropologist, journalist and rifle medic for the 77th Airmobile Brigade, was killed in Bakhmut.
- On 2 June, fighter pilot Vladyslav Savieliev, call sign "Nomad", died during a combat mission on Pokrovsk, Donetsk Oblast. He was a MiG-29 pilot who participated in a US-sponsored training program at Columbus Air Force Base, Mississippi.
- On 13 June, Roman Chornomaz, sniper and member of the Svoboda political party, was killed in Kurdiumivka.
- On 22 July, Dimytro Rybakov, Commander of the 47th Mechanized Brigade, was killed in combat in direction of Melitopol. He was also a well known journalist and Economic commentator.
- On 31 July, Yuliia Shevchenko, Lieutenant of the 47th Mechanized Brigade and activist, was killed in Orihiv.
- On 4 August, Serhii Slabenko, a former member of the Verkhovna Rada, died during the 2023 Ukrainian counteroffensive in Zaporizhzhia Oblast.
- On 11 August, Major Tsyb Yuri, chief of staff and deputy Commander of the Separate Presidential Brigade, died in Kupiansk, Kharkiv Oblast.
- On 22 August, Colonel Serhii Ilnytskyi, deputy of the Kyiv City Council and deputy commander of the Ukrainian Volunteer Army and Commander of a detachment of the 28th Mechanized Brigade died in Kurdyumivka, Bakhmut.
- On 25 August, Lieutenant Colonel Yuri Pushkin, Commander of the Separate 55th Communications Brigade, was killed in Lyman, Donetsk Oblast.
- On 25 August, pilots from 40th Tactical Aviation Brigade; Major Andrii Pilshchykov (call sign Juice), Viacheslav Minka and Serhii Prokazin, deputy Commander, died in a flight training accident near Sinhury, Zhytomyr Oblast.
- On 30 August, Colonel Oleh Babiy, Deputy Commander of the Main Directorate of Intelligence, was killed.
- On 9 October, Lieutenant Colonel Vitaly Baranov, Commander of the 204th Battalion of the 241st Territorial Brigade was killed in Donetsk.
- On 3 November, Colonel Volodomyr Vozny, Head of the Recruitment Center of Territorial Defense in Khmelnytskyi, was killed during 2023 Ukrainian counteroffensive in Zaporizhzhia Oblast.
- On 3 November, Lieutenant Colonel Andriy Tarasenko, deputy commander of the 128th Mountain Assault Brigade, was killed in a Russian attack on Zarichne barracks
- On 6 November, the top aide of the Commander of Ukrainian Armed forces Valerii Zaluzhnyi, Major Hennadii Chastiakov was killed by an explosive device on the day of his birthday.
- On 29 November, Roman Hodovanyi, a professional footballer, was killed.
- On 30 November, Oleksandr Kalynychenko, who was the silver medalist in 1986 Montreal, was killed during a mission.

=== 2024 ===
- On 7 January, Maksym Kryvtsov, Ukrainian poet and military volunteer, was killed in battle in Kharkiv Oblast.
- On 24 January, Serhiy Rozhok, a professional footballer, was killed in action.
- On 28 January, Ruslan Pomirchiy, a Deputy of the Ivano-Frankivsk Oblast Council, for the Svoboda party, was killed in Kupyansk.
- On 31 January, Oleksandr Bilokon, who was the European and World Champion in powerlifting, as well as a winner of "The Strongest Man of Ukraine", was killed in battle.

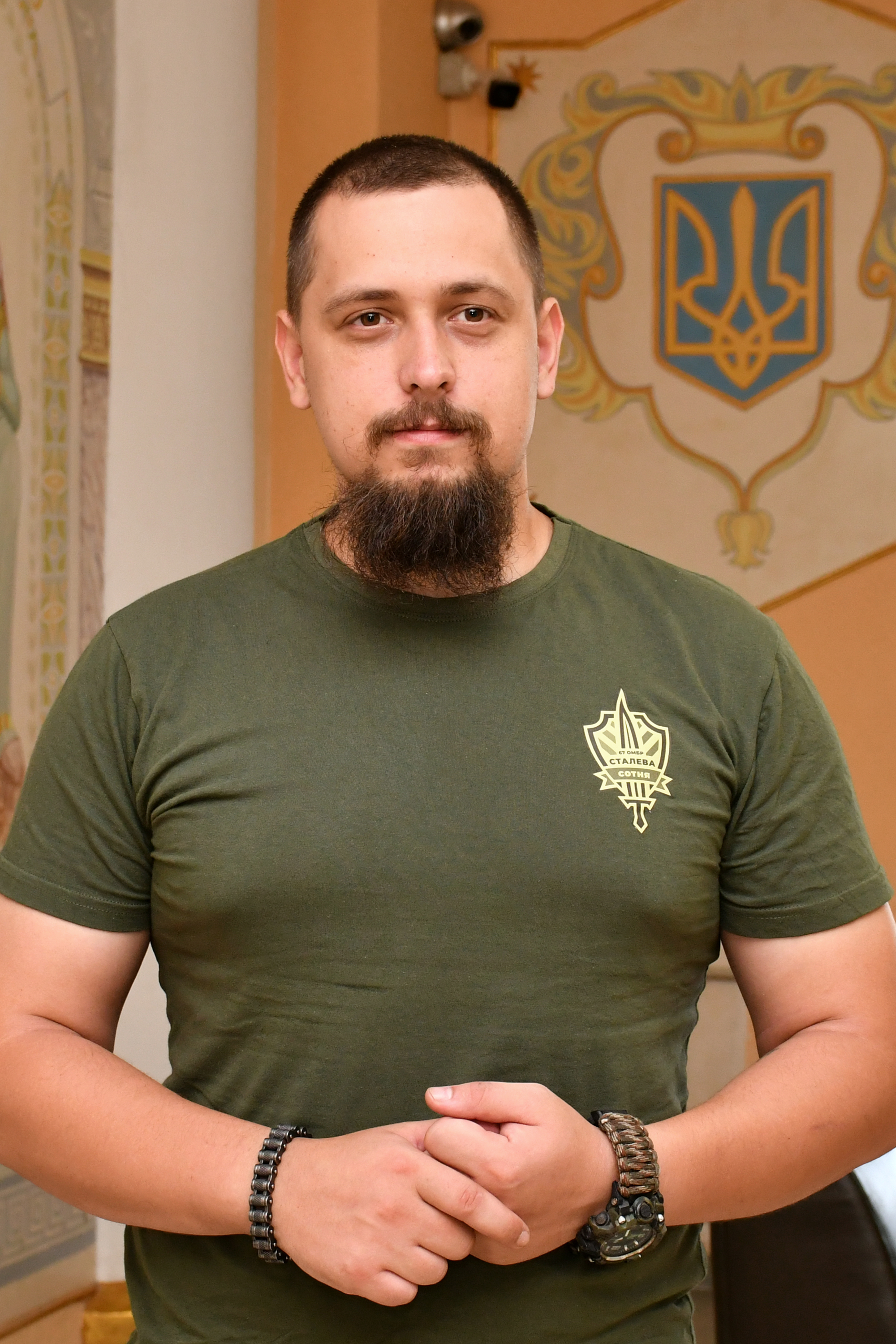
Ukrainian Commander of the 67th Mechanized Brigade, Serhii Konoval

- On 15 March Russian an Iskander-M missile strike killed 19 people in Odessa, including:
  - Oleksandr Hostyshchev, Commander of the ''Tsunami Batalion'' of the Liut Brigade, and former Head of Patrol of the National Police of Odesa
  - Dmitry Abramenko, the Deputy Chief of the National Police of Odessa
  - Serhii Tetyukhin, former Deputy Mayor of Odessa
- On 27 March, Andriy Antonyshchak, a former member of Verkhovna Rada, died by wounds suffered in battle.
- On 29 March, Iryna Tsybukh, Ukrainian public figure, manager of the Department of Regional Public Broadcasting Company of Ukraine and paramedic of Hospitallers Medical Battalion was killed in the front.
- On 6 April Jr, Lieutenant Serhii Konoval, commander of 2nd Infantry Company of 67th Mechanized Brigade died during the Battle of Chasiv Yar.
- On 17 May, Lieutenant Colonel Denys Vasyliuk, First Deputy Commander of the Aviation Squadron of the 831st Tactical Aviation Brigade, was shot down by an enemy missile during a combat mission on his Su-27P.
- On 10 June, Mykola Kokhanovskyi, founder of the OUN Volunteer Battalion of the Ukrainian Right Sector, was killed in combat in Kharkiv.
- On 16 June, Major Oleksandr Egorov, the Deputy Commander of the 117th Mechanized Brigade was killed in Zaporothzya oblast.
- On 24 July, the former mayor of Uman, Oleksandr Tsebrii was killed in the combat zone. Tsebrii was serving in the 58th Motorized Brigade.
- On 2 August, Lieutenant Colonel Oleg Pigulevskyi, commander of the 28th Separate Rifle Battalion, was killed near Provosk.
- On 12 August, Captain Oleksander Myhulia, commander of a Squadron of the 40th Tactical Aviation Brigade was killed during a combat mission.
- On 26 August, during a Russian missile attack, were killed:
  - Oleksii Mes, callname Moonfish, a US trained pilot while on his F-16 repelling Russian missile attacks.
  - Serhiy Serhiychuk, who was previously Governor of Cherkasy Oblast, was killed.
- On 29 August, Roman Holovatyuk, a worldchampion kickboxer, was killed during its service at the 8th Special Purpose Regiment.
- On 1 September, Colonel Viktor Polyvany, Brigade Commander of the 160th Anti-Aircraft Missile Brigade was killed in the Kharkiv region.
- On 18 September, Yevgeny Lemeshenko, Commander of the 73rd Special Forces Center was killed in Kursk operation.
- On 20 September, a Russian missile strike in Dobropillia, Donetsk killed the following servicemen:
  - Colonel Oleksandr Nykytyuk, advisor to former Commander in Chief Valerii Zaluzhnyi.
  - Lieutenant Colonel Vasyl Lapchuk, deputy commander of the 14th Mechanized Brigade.
- On 21 September, Nina Pashkevich, an athlete and female Weightlifting Champion, died in battle.
- On 5 October, Ildar Dadin, a Russian political activist turned International Foreign Fighter from the Sibir Battalion, was killed in Kharkiv.
- On 22 October, Dmytro Bohachov, a professional footballer, was killed.
- On 24 October, Col. Sergeii Lipsy the Commander of the 57th Motorized Brigade was killed in combat.
- On 17 November, Dmytro Maslovskyi, who served in the 71st Jaeger Brigade, was killed during a close quarters knife duel near Trudove with a Russian soldier while it was recorded by his body camera.
- On 4 December, Lieutenant Colonel Yaroslav Akimenko, Brigade Commander of the 58th Motorized Brigade (Ukraine) was killed in combat.
- On 10 December, Yakiv Tkachenko, an actor and soldier of Territorial Defense forces, was killed in combat.

=== 2025 ===
- On 30 January, Vladyslav Zaporozhets, Battalion Commander of the 79th Air Assault Brigade, was killed while deployed in the Prokovsk front.
- On 5 February, Maksym Yemets, a Ukrainian poet, was killed in Pokrovsk.
- On 5 March, Volodymir Stogniy, Battalion Commander of the 37th Marine Brigade was killed in battle.
- On 13 April, Bohdan Lysenko, a journalist during the War in Donbas, was killed by enemy fire.
- On 13 April, Colonel Yuri Yula, Brigade Commander of the 27th Rocket Artillery Brigade was killed in a missile attack on Sumy.
- On 20 April, Andriy Dziuban, a coach and Master in Thai boxing martial art and weightlifting, was killed while fighting for the 82nd Separate Airborne Assault Brigade in Sudzhansky, Kursk Oblast.
- On 12 May, Senior Lieutenant. Maksym Nelipa, Ukrainian actor and TV presenter turned soldier was killed in the front.
- On 6 June, Colonel Oleg Nomerovsky, military officer of the TCR of Odessa was killed in a car bomb attack.
- On 8 June, Vladyslav Gorai, a Ukrainian Opera singer, was killed in Sumy oblast.
- On 12 June, Rodion "Gene" Pustovoi, a member of the Ukrainian National Water Polo team, was killed in Sumy.
- On 15 June, Yurii Felipenko, an actor and celebrity turned soldier, was killed in the Prokovsk front.
- On 22 June, Lieutenant Colonel Vano Nadiradze, Georgian Voluntier and head of Special Operations Forces was reported dead by a heart attack.
- On 1 July, a Russian missile strike, likely an Iskander-M missile, killed multiple people in Huliapole (village), Dnipro Oblast including:
  - Colonel Serhiy Zakharevich, Brigade Commander of the 110th Mechanized Brigade
  - Lieutenant Colonel Dmitry Romaniuk, Deputy Commander of the 110th Mechanized Brigade
  - Lieutenant Colonel Valery Mirzayev, Chief of Staff of the 110th Mechanized Brigade
- On 10 July, Colonel Ivan Voronych, a SBU senior intelligence officer, was shot and killed at daylight in Kyiv by an unidentified assailant.
- On 19 July, Colonel Konstantin Oborin, aviator and President of Odessa Aviation Club was killed during a combat mission.
- On 22 July, Colonel Maxim Kasban Commander of the Liut Brigade was killed in a road accident in Donetsk.
- On 10 August, David Chichkan, an artist and anarco-activist, was killed by Russian fire in the Zaporizhzhia Oblast.
- On 10 August, Bogdan Koltsov, a member of the DeepStateMap.Live team that monitor the territorial control of the war, was killed in Novopavlovka.
- On 10 August, Davyd Chychkan, an artist, was killed.
- On 30 August, Yuri Chikatilo, son of Andrei Chikatilo, an infamous serial killer in the Soviet Union, was killed while fighting for the Armed Forces of Ukraine.
- On 10 September, Denis Furtas, a World Champion in Savate Kickboxing, was killed in the Kupyansk front.

=== 2026 ===
- On 1 January, Lana Chornohorska, a journalist and artist, was killed.
- On 15 February, Dmytro Rusetzkyi, a Kickboxing champion, was killed while fighting in Sumy Oblast.
- On 26 February, Oleksander Kursik, journalist and political figure, was reported killed.
- On 9 March, Colonel Oleksandr Dovhach, Brigade Commander of the 39th Tactical Aviation Brigade was shot down and killed during a combat mission while flying on his Su-27.
- On 24 July, a Russian missile strike, targeted a military exhibition on Kiyv, killing multiple people including:
  - Colonel Eduard Sirenko from the Security Service of Ukraine (SBU) and the Main Intelligence Directorate (GUR) of the Ministry of Defence.
  - Valentyna Savitska, Head of the International Cooperation and Strategic Communications at State Security Service (SBU).
- On 25 July, Vitaliy Dakhivnyk, a sculptor, was killed by wounds.
- On 29 August, Roman Buzile, a national cycling champion, was killed in battle.

== Ukrainian civilians and journalists ==
=== 2022 ===
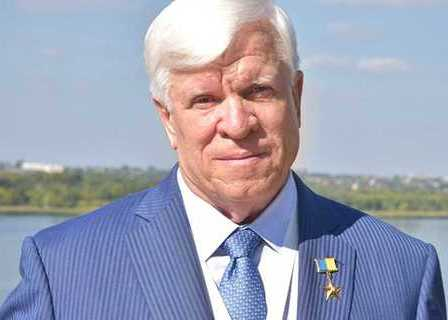
Oleksiy Vadaturskyi agricultural and logistic businessman died in Mykolaiv

- On 5 March Ukrainian banker and intelligence officer Denys Kireyev was killed by the Security Service of Ukraine (SBU).
- On 7 March, Mayor of Hostomel, Yuriy Prylypko, was killed by Russian forces.
- On 17 March, Artem Datsyshyn, a ballet dancer, died from injuries suffered on 26 February from Russian shelling in Kyiv.
- On 17 March, Yevhen Obedinsky, a member of the Ukrainian Olympic water polo team, died in the Siege of Mariupol.
- On 18 March, Borys Romanchenko, a Holocaust survivor, was killed in a shelling attack in Kharkiv.
- On 18 March, Oksana Shvets, an actress, died in a shelling attack on a Kyiv residential building.
- On 23 March, the Mayor of Motyzhyn, Olga Sukhenko, was killed by Russian forces.
- On 29 March, Natalia Kharakoz, a journalist and writer killed during the Siege of Mariupol. She made history as the first woman from Mariupol to join the National Writers' Union of Ukraine (NSPU).
- On 31 March, Oleksiy Tsybko, a rugby union player, was killed by Russian forces.
- On 2 April, the Prosecutor General's office announced the death of photographer Maks Levin due to Russian small-arms fire outside Kyiv. He had disappeared on 13 March.
- On 6 April, Kateryna Diachenko, an 10-year old rhythmic gymnast, and her father, was killed during the Siege of Mariupol.
- On 28 April, Vira Hyrych, a journalist, was killed by Russian shelling in Kyiv.
- On 29 April, the Mariupol City Council reported that Alina Peregudova, 14, who won gold at Ukraine's national weightlifting championship in 2021 and was on course to represent Ukraine at the Olympics, was killed by Russian shelling in Mariupol. Her mother was also killed in the attack.
- On 30 April, Lyubov Panchenko, a fashion designer, died of starvation in Bucha.
- On 31 July, Oleksiy Vadaturskyi, an agricultural and grain logistics businessman and the founder of Nibulon, the largest grain logistic company in Ukraine, was killed by Russian shelling in Mykolaiv. His wife was also killed in the attack.
- On 12 October, Yurii Kerpatenko, principal conductor of the Mykola Kulish Music and Drama Theatre, was killed by Russian forces in his home in Kherson.

=== 2023 ===
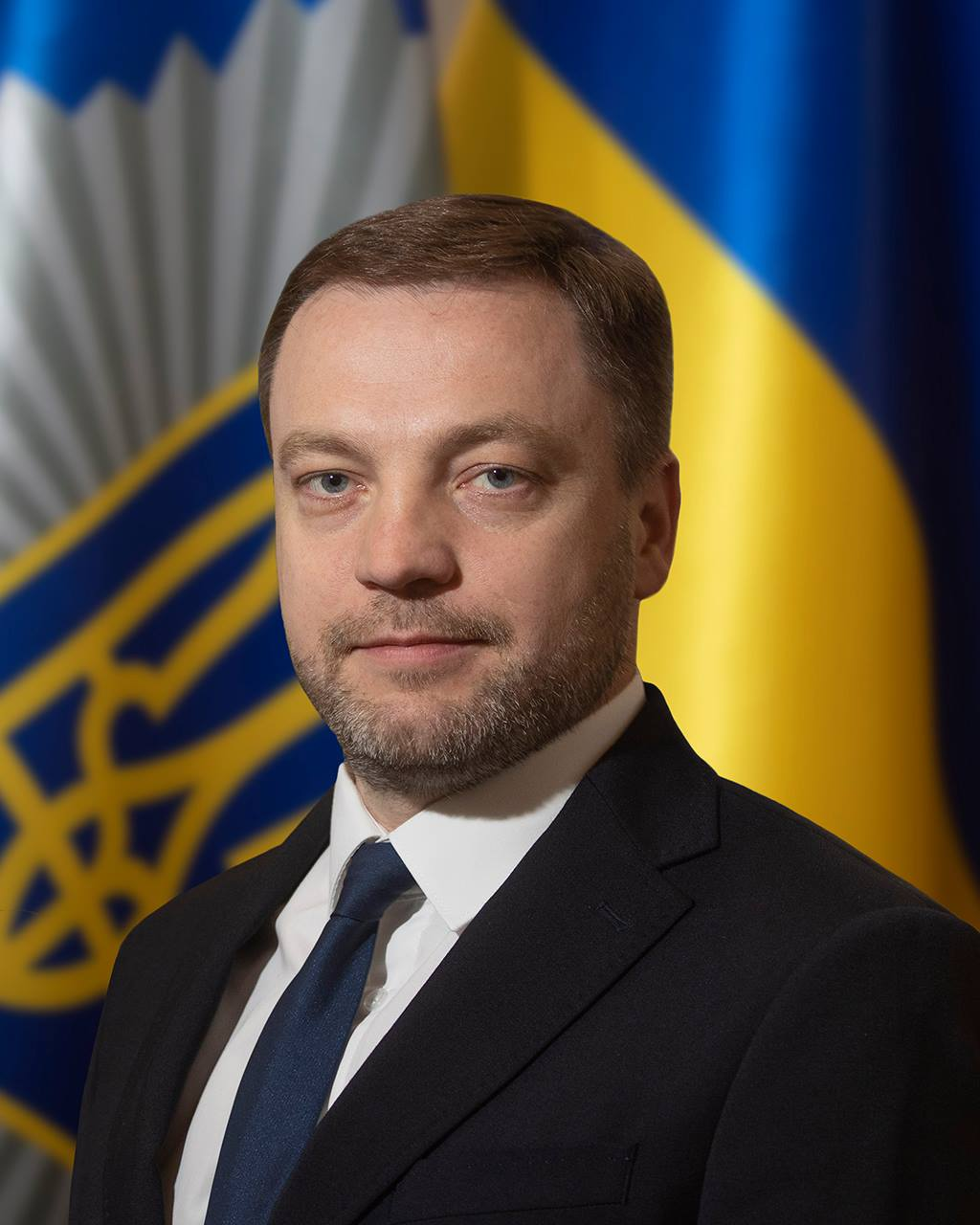
Ministry of Internal Affairs Denys Monastyrsky killed in a helicopter accident on 18 January 2023

- On 14 January, boxing coach Mykhailo Korenovsky and 44 others were killed during the 2023 Dnipro residential building airstrike.
- On 18 January 2023, multiple people were killed in a helicopter crash in Brovary, Kyiv Oblast, including
  - Denys Monastyrsky, Minister of Internal Affairs
  - Yevhen Yenin, Deputy Minister of Internal Affairs
  - Yurii Lubkovych, State Secretary of Internal Affairs
- In June, writer and war crimes researcher Victoria Amelina died of wounds suffered in a missile attack on Kramatorsk, Donetsk Oblast.

=== 2024 ===
- On 20 July, Iryna Farion, a former member of the Verkhovna Rada was killed.
- On 29 September, Victoria Roshchyna, a journalist, was killed while in Russian detention.

=== 2025 ===
- On 1 January, two prominent scientists, biologist Olesya Vadimovna Sokur and her husband neurobiologist Igor Zima were killed in a Kyiv drone strike.
- On 14 March, far-right activist from the Right Sector, Demyan Hanul was killed by an assailant in Odessa.
- On 30 August, Andriy Parubiy, former Chairman of the Verkhovna Rada, co-founder of the Social-National Party of Ukraine in 1991, and Euromaidan activist, was shot dead in Lviv.

=== 2026 ===
- On 5 August, Oleksii Yukov, the head of the Ukrainian Platsdarm volunteer search unit, died of wounds received while recovering fallen soldiers in eastern Ukraine.

== Foreign civilians and journalists ==
- On 13 March 2022, Brent Renaud, an American journalist and documentarian, was killed by Russian forces.
- On 2 April 2022, Mantas Kvedaravičius, a Lithuanian documentarian, was killed while fleeing the Siege of Mariupol.
- On 15 November 2022, Polish civilians Bogusław Wos and Bogdan Ciupek were killed during the 2022 missile explosion in Poland in Przewodów, Poland.

== Russian and DPR/LPR military ==
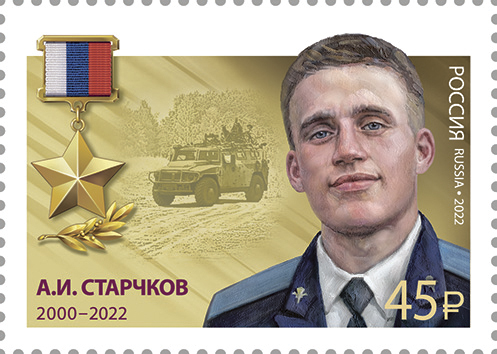
Russian postage stamp honoring a soldier killed in Ukraine who was awarded the title of Hero of the Russian Federation

=== 2022 ===
- On 4 March, Major general Andrei Sukhovetsky, deputy commander of the 41st Combined Arms Army, was killed in combat.
- On 5 March, Colonel Vladimir Zhoga, commander of DPRs Sparta Battalion, was killed in Volnovakha.
- On 10 March, Captain Maksym Misharin, a pro-Russian collaborator, militant of the armed formation "Oplot", was killed in Mariupol. He was posthumously declared a Hero of the Donetsk People's Republic.
- On 19–20 March, Russian officials confirmed that Captain 1st rank Andrei Paliy, a deputy commander of the Black Sea Fleet, was killed in combat in Mariupol.
- On 16 April, Russian officials said that Major General Vladimir Petrovich Frolov, Deputy Commander of the 8th Guards Army, was killed in combat in Ukraine, details were not provided.
- On 22 May, retired Major general Kanamat Botashev, fighting for Wagner PMC, was killed in Luhansk Oblast when his Su-25 was shot down by a FIM-92 Stinger missile.

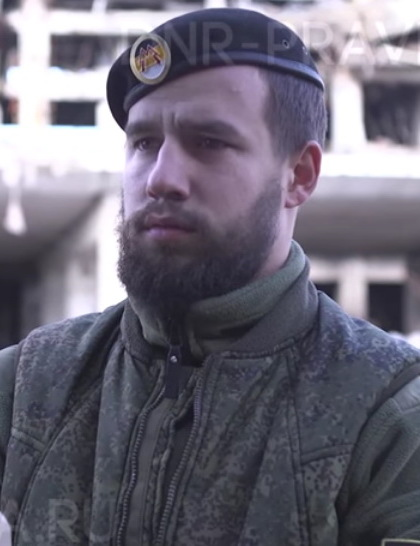
Col. Vladimir Zhoga from pro-Russian separatist forces Sparta Battalion

- On 5 June, Lieutenant general Roman Kutuzov, Commander of the 1st Army Corps, Donetsk People's Militia, was killed in Popasna raion, Luhansk.
- On 9 July, Colonel Alexey Gorobets, Commander of the 20th Guards Motor Rifle Division, was killed by a HIMARS attack in Kherson Oblast.
- On 29 July, Colonel Olga Kachura was killed by a missile strike in Horlivka.

=== 2023 ===
- On 8 February, Captain Igor Mangushev succumbed to his injuries after being shot in the back of the head while in Luhansk Oblast four days earlier.
- On 28 April, The New Voice of Ukraine reported that three winners of the Russian tank biathlon, Maxim Zharko, Bato Basanov, and Alexey Bakulo had been killed in Ukraine.
- On 12 June, Major General Sergey Goryachev, Chief of Staff of the 35th Combined Arms Army, was allegedly killed by a missile strike in Zaporizhzhia Oblast.
- On 11 July, Lieutenant general Oleg Tsokov was killed by a missile strike during the Ukrainian counteroffensive.

=== 2025 ===
- On 9 March, Alexander Petlinsky, a 18-years old student at Chelyabinsk Medical College was killed. The first known death of a Russian soldier born in 2007.
- On 2 July Major General Mikhail Gudkov Commander of the 155 Guards Naval Infantry Brigade and Deputy Commander-in-Chief of the Russian Navy was killed by a Ukrainian missile strike in Kursk Oblast, Russia.

== Pro-Russian Ukrainian civilians ==
- On 2 March 2022, Volodymyr Struk, the mayor of Kreminna and a former member of the Verkhovna Rada was found shot dead after being kidnapped.
- On 27 March 2022, Oleksandr Rzhavskyy, a former member of the Verkhovna Rada, was killed by Russian forces during the Bucha massacre.
- On 20 April 2022, Valery Kuleshov, a pro-Russian blogger, was shot dead in a car in Kherson.
- On 9 May 2022, Davyd Zhvania, a former member of the Verkhovna Rada and Emergency Minister of Ukraine, was killed by Russian forces in Novoprokovka, Zaporizhzhia Oblast.
- On 28 August 2022, Oleksii Kovalov, a member of the Verkhovna Rada, was shot dead during an attack at his residence in Hola Prystan, Kherson Oblast.
- On 16 September 2022, Sergei Gorenko, Prosecutor General of the Luhansk People's Republic, was killed in an explosion of an improvised explosive device in Luhansk Oblast.
- On 25 September 2022, Oleksiy Zhuravko, a former member of the Verkhovna Rada, died in a Ukrainian airstrike in Kherson during the Ukrainian southern counteroffensive.
- On 9 November 2022, Kirill Stremousov, deputy head of the Russian administration in Kherson Oblast and pro-Russian social media personality, died in a car crash in Henichesk.
- On 6 December 2023, Illia Kyva, a former member of the Verkhovna Rada, was shot dead in Moscow, Russia.
- On 21 May 2025, Andriy Portnov, a former member of the Verkhovna Rada, was shot dead in Madrid, Spain.

== See also ==
- Casualties of the Russo-Ukrainian war
