= Makhov =

Makhov (Russian: Махов) is a Russian masculine surname originating from the adjective makhonkii (tiny); its feminine counterpart is Makhova. It may refer to the following notable people:

- Bilyal Makhov (born 1987), Russian wrestler and mixed martial artist
- Oleksandr Makhov (1986–2022), Ukrainian military officer
- Todor Makhov (born 1961), Bulgarian cross-country skier
