= 148th Brigade =

148th Brigade may refer to:

- 148th Artillery Brigade, Ukraine
- 148th Infantry Brigade, United Kingdom

== See also ==
- 148th Division (disambiguation)
- 148th Regiment (disambiguation)
