= 8th Air Assault Corps =

Ukrainian Ground Forces formation

- 8-й десантно-штурмовий корпус
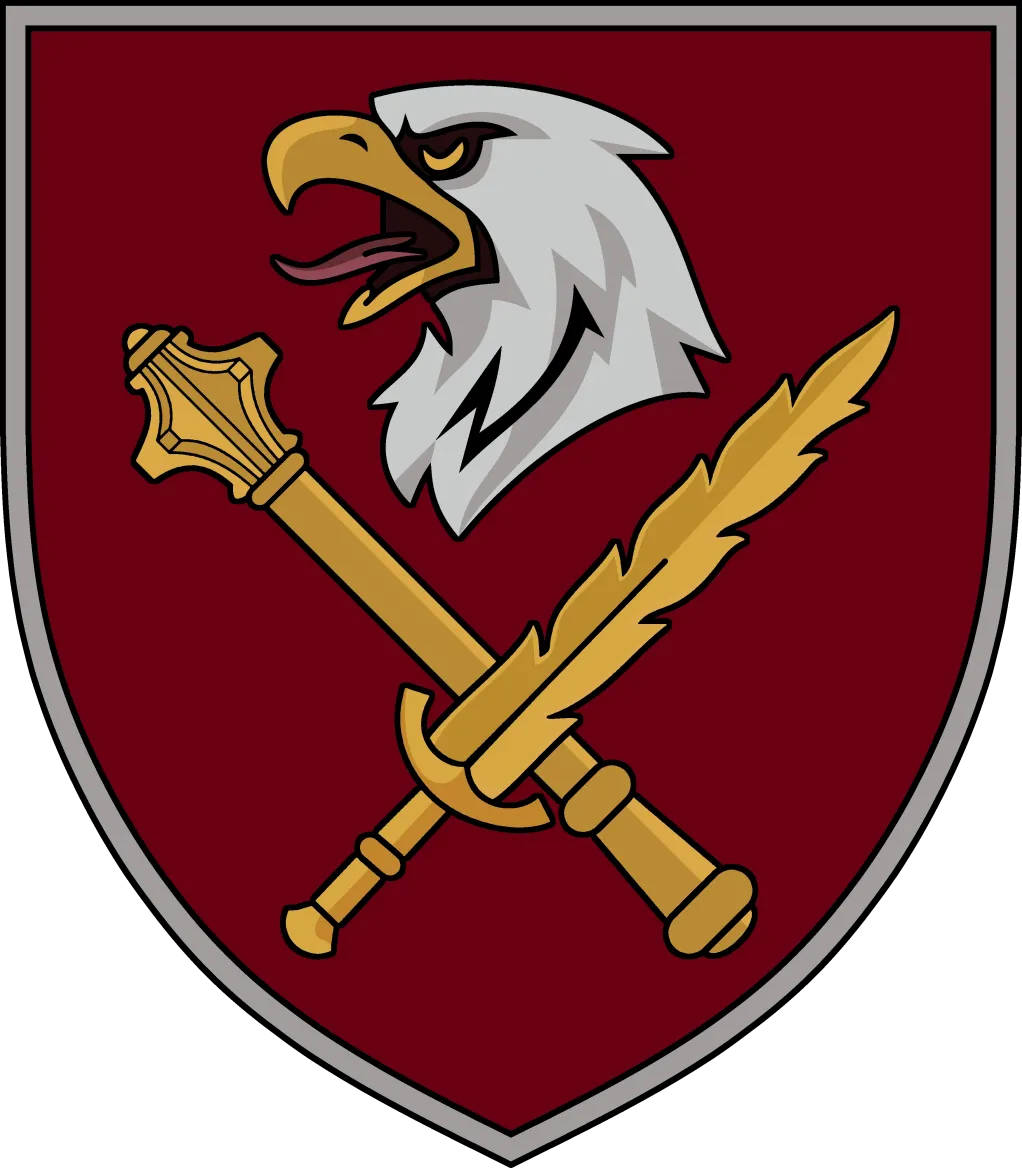
- Shoulder sleeve insignia
- Active: 2025 – present
- Country: Ukraine
- Branch: Ukrainian Air Assault Forces
- Size: 40,000 - 80,000
- Garrison/HQ: Chernivtsi, Chernivtsi Oblast
- Engagements: Russo-Ukrainian War
- Website: Official Facebook page

Commanders
- Current commander: Col. Dmytro Voloshyn

The 8th Air Assault Corps (Note: Ukrainian: 8-й десантно-штурмовий корпус) is a combined arms corps of the Ukrainian Air Assault Forces.

== History ==
The creation of this corps represents a strategic enhancement in Ukraine's military structure, aligning it more closely with NATO-style corps units.

== Structure ==
As of 2025 the corps structure is as follows:

- 8th Air Assault Corps
  - Corps Headquarters
    - 88th Headquarters Battalion
  - 46th Airmobile Brigade
  - 71st Airmobile Brigade
  - 80th Air Assault Brigade
  - 82nd Air Assault Brigade
  - 95th Air Assault Brigade
  - 148th Artillery Brigade
