= 71st Airmobile Brigade (Ukraine) =

Ukrainian Air Assault Forces unit

71st Airmobile Brigade (2026–present) 71st Jaeger Brigade (2022–2026)
- Ukrainian: 71-ша окрема аеромобільна бригада
- Unit insignia featuring a Simargl
- Active: 2022 – present
- Country: Ukraine
- Allegiance: Armed Forces of Ukraine
- Branch: Ukrainian Air Assault Forces
- Type: Brigade
- Role: Airmobile infantry
- Part of: 8th Air Assault Corps
- Garrison/HQ: Pavlohrad, Dnipro Oblast
- Motto: IMMITIS (Latin for Merciless)
- Engagements: Russo-Ukrainian War; Russian invasion of Ukraine; Southern Ukraine offensive; Battle of Mykolaiv; Battle of Bakhmut; Battle of the Svatove–Kreminna line
- Decorations: For Courage and Bravery

Insignia
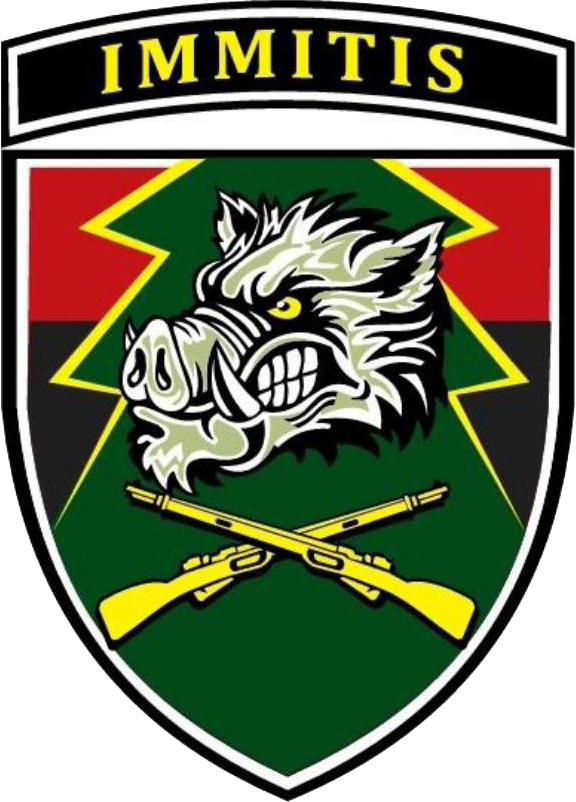
- Former Insignia

The 71st Separate Airmobile Brigade (MUN : A4030) is an air assault brigade of the Ukrainian Air Assault Forces, formed in 2022 in response to the Russian invasion of Ukraine.

== History ==
The 71st Jaeger Brigade was created soon after the launch of the Russian invasion of Ukraine, which escalated the Russo-Ukrainian War on 24 February 2022. The word "Jaeger" is German for "hunters", implying forest troops, and the units are neither light nor heavy.

Raised as a unit of the Reserve Corps, in April 2022 units of the new brigade left the Reserve and took part in hostilities in the Kharkiv Oblast under the Air Assault Forces. From June 2022, they also appeared in the Donbas.

Units of the 71st Brigade were seen in the initial stages of the Ukrainian offensive in the Kharkiv region in September 2022. Between 5 and 8 September, its fighters crossed the Donets River and led an offensive on Balakliia, coming from the direction of Husarivka. In October 2022, soldiers of the brigade were honoured by the commanding officer of the Ukrainian Air Assault Forces, Major-General Maksym Myrhorodsky, his message stating that at that time they were performing combat missions in the Donetsk region. In the same month, the Brigade was reported as taking part in defensive battles near Bakhmut, and according to the Austrian analyst Tom Cooper in a successful counterattack on the outskirts of that city in December.

As of December 2022, the Ukrainian armed forces had three such Jaeger brigades, each with around 2,000 fighters, the 61st, 68th, and 71st Jaeger Brigades.

During the 2023 Ukrainian counteroffensive, the brigade was involved in combat on the Zaporizhzhia direction.

It became part of the 8th Air Assault Corps.

=== Structure 2024 ===
- 71st Jaeger Brigade (Airmobile), Pavlohrad, Dnipro Oblast
  - Brigade Headquarters and HQ Company
  - 1st Jaeger Battalion
  - 2nd Jaeger Battalion
  - 3rd Jaeger Battalion
  - Separate Special Purpose Company "Immitis" (OUN)
  - 52nd Separate Rifle Battalion (Airmobile) (A4128)
  - Field Artillery Regiment
    - Regimental HQ and TAG Battery
    - Recon, FDC and Observer Battery
    - Field Artillery Battalions (Self Propelled) (2x), each battalion organized into:
      - Battalion HQ and HQ Battery
      - 1st field gun artillery battery
      - 2nd field gun artillery battery
      - 3rd field gun artillery battery
    - Field Artillery Battalion (Towed Field Gun) (M101 howitzer)
    - Field Artillery Battalion (MLRS)
    - Anti-tank artillery battalion (Towed)
  - Air Defense Missile Artillery Battalion
  - Mortar battery (Air-transportable)
  - Anti-tank guided missile battery
  - Aerial Reconnaissance Company
    - "Leleka" ("Stork") UAV Platoon
  - Combat engineer company
  - Automotive company
  - CBRN protection company
  - Field signals company
  - Medical company
  - MP Platoon
  - Brigade Band

== Honours ==
On 6 December 2022, by a decree of the President of Ukraine, Volodymyr Zelenskyi, the 71st Jaeger Brigade was awarded the "For Bravery and Courage" award.

== See also ==
- Maslovsky Dmytro Olegovych - Hero of Ukraine from 71st Brigade.
