= Vadym Khlupianets =

Ukrainian ballet dancer and military personnel (1996–2022)

- Born: 4 June 1996; Donetsk, Ukraine
- Died: 15 November 2022 (aged 26); Bakhmut, Ukraine
- Occupation: Military personnel
- Known for: The ballet dancer of the Kyiv National Academic Theatre of Operetta

Vadym Vasylovych Khlupianets (Ukrainian: Вадим Васильович Хлуп'янець, 4 June 1996 – 15 November 2022) was a Ukrainian ballet dancer at the Kyiv National Academic Theatre of Operetta and a participant in the Russo-Ukrainian War. He died during the Russian invasion of Ukraine.

== Biography ==
Khlupianets was born in Donetsk on 4 June 1996, and he studied in the Ukrainian language class at school No. 91. In the aftermath of the occupation of Donetsk by the separatist forces, his family moved to live with their relatives in the village of Staryi Dorohyn, Narodytskyi Raion of Zhytomyr Oblast. He was in the status of an immigrant person in the Narodytskyi settlement hromada from 16 June 2014.

He graduated from the Kyiv Choreographic College. In 2015, he joined the Kyiv National Academic Theater of Operetta as a ballet dancer. He was also engaged in sports, including football and chess, and participated in the sports life of the theatre. In 2017, he was recognised as the best scorer in the mini-football tournament among theatre teams in Kyiv. He spent his a free-time from work studying hip-hop.

=== Russian invasion of Ukraine ===
At the beginning of the full-scale invasion of Ukraine, he joined the Armed Forces of Ukraine, and later he went to the frontlines as a volunteer in the Svoboda Legion combat unit of the national guard. With his call sign Magnum, he passed through Rubizhne, Sievierodonetsk, Lysychansk, and Zaitseve.

Khlupianets died from a sniper's bullet near Bakhmut on 15 November 2022, initially, he was reported as dead on 13 November, but it was later clarified.

The farewell ceremony took place on 24 November on the premises of the Kyiv National Academic Theatre of Operetta, on the day of the premiere of the performance The ball, which was directed by Matteo Spiazzi from Italy, a role in which Vadym rehearsed but did not play (the first premiere performance of the collective dedicated the theatre to Vadym) Among those present at the ceremony were relatives of the deceased, colleagues and military personnel, and caring citizens.

His remains were buried in the village of Staryi Dorohyn of Zhytomyr Oblast.

== Arts ==
=== Theatre's roles ===
As a ballet dancer of the Kyiv National Academic Theatre of Operetta, he was involved in productions of:

- After two hares
- Carmen
- Such Jewish happiness by Ihor Poklad, directed by Serhiy Smiian
- 2018 - Fiddler on the Roof to the music of J. Bock, directed by Bohdan Strutynskyi
- 2018 - Moskalytsa by Maria Matios, directed by Vlada Belozorenko
- 2021 - Dorian Gray by Asa Janos and Gunnar Braunckem, based on the novel The Picture of Dorian Gray by Oscar Wilde, directed by Vadym Prokopenko

=== Filmography ===
- 2017 - full-length feature film Rzhaka, directed by Dmytro Tomashpolskyi
