= Anastasiia Blyshchyk =

Ukrainian journalist, soldier

- Анастасія Сергіївна Блищик
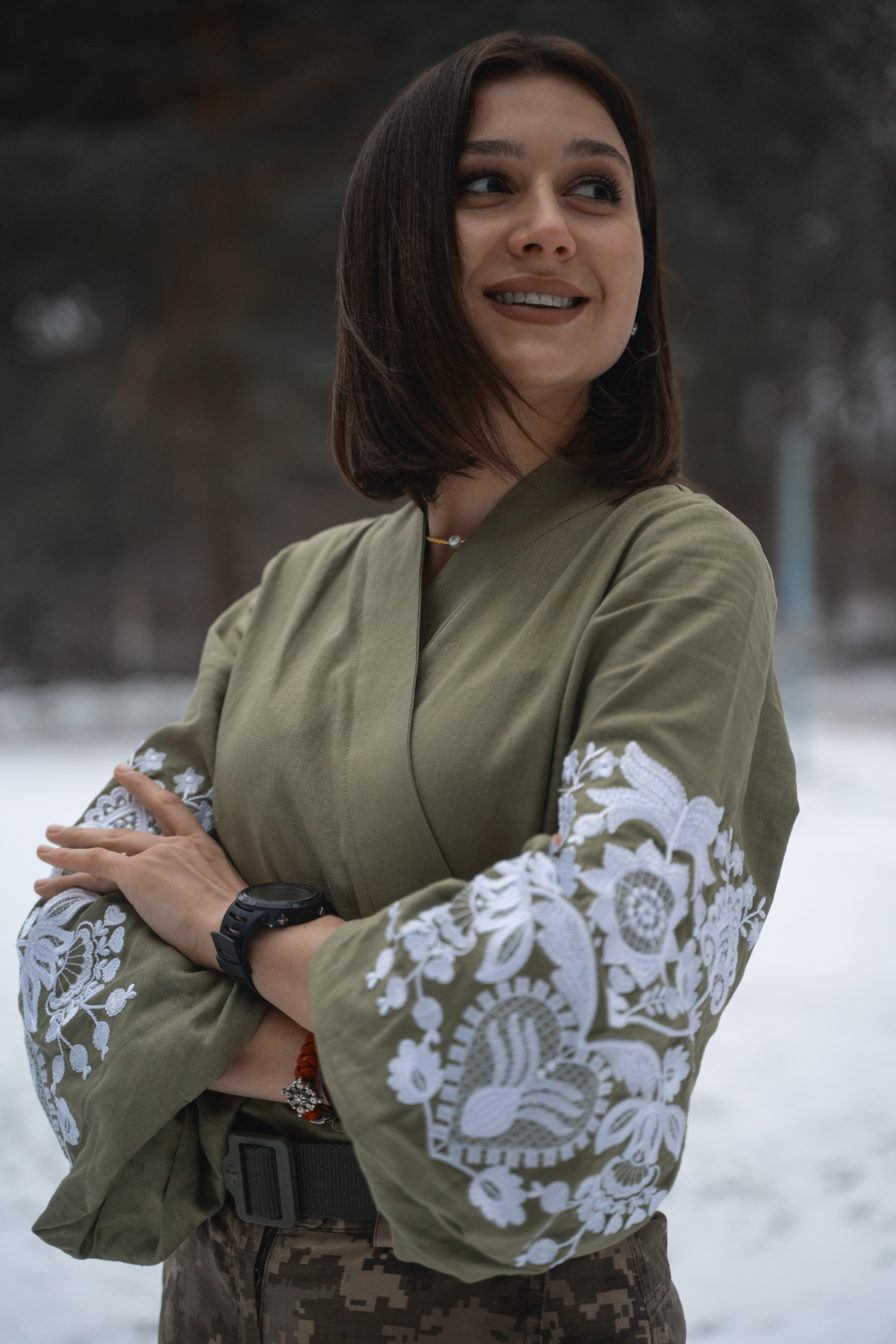
- Born: Anastasiia Serhiivna Blyshchyk; Kherson Oblast
- Education: Zaporizhzhia National University
- Occupations: Journalist, soldier

Anastasiia Serhiivna Blyshchyk (Ukrainian: Анастасія Сергіївна Блищик; born in Kherson Oblast) is a Ukrainian journalist, a soldier of the Armed Forces of Ukraine, a lieutenant of the 47th Separate Mechanized Brigade of the Armed Forces of Ukraine, a participant in the Russian-Ukrainian war. Member of the Women's Veterans Movement (2022).

The leading Italian daily newspaper Il Foglio chose Anastasiia Blyshchyk as the Person of the Year 2022.

== Biography ==
She graduated from the Faculty of Journalism at Zaporizhzhia National University.

She worked as a journalist for Espreso TV, Ukraine and Ukraine 24 (2019-2022).

=== Russian-Ukrainian war ===
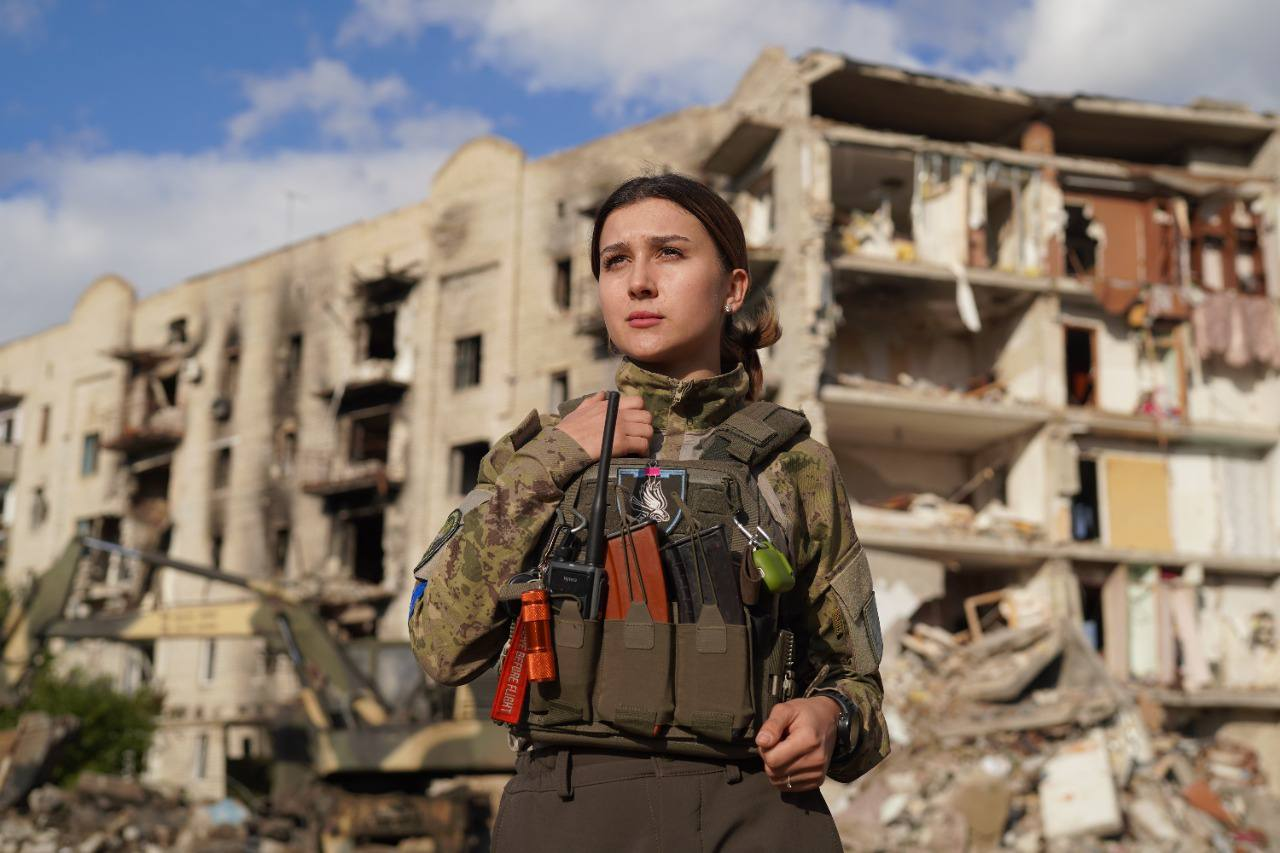
Anastasiia Blyshchyk in the liberated Izium, Kharkiv Oblast. October 3, 2022.

She joined the Armed Forces of Ukraine voluntarily after her fiancé, journalist and a soldier of the Armed Forces of Ukraine Oleksandr Makhov, was killed in Kharkiv Oblast in May 2022. At first, she served as a press officer in the Izium battalion of the TDF, and now she holds the same position in the 47th separate mechanized brigade.

On March 8, 2023, the Commander-in-Chief of the Armed Forces of Ukraine Valerii Zaluzhnyi presented Blyshchyk with a shoulder strap with the rank of "junior lieutenant".

She initiated the renaming of streets in Kyiv and Izyum in honor of Oleksandr Makhov. On November 20, 2022, AnastasiIa Blyshchyk put up the first sign with the street's name.

== Awards ==
- honorary breast badge of the Commander-in-Chief of the Armed Forces of Ukraine "Silver Cross" (2023)
- a decoration from Brigadier General Oleksandr Tarnavskyi
- a diploma from the Minister of Defense of Ukraine Oleksii Reznikov

== Military ranks ==
- Lieutenant (2024)
- Junior Lieutenant (8.3.2023)
- soldier (2022)
