= Serhii Ilnytskyi =

Ukrainian colonel, politician, public figure and athlete

Serhii Ilnytskyi Сергій Ільницький
- Born: 20 May 1970; Kyiv, Ukrainian SSR, Soviet Union
- Died: 22 August 2023 (aged 53) †; Kurdiumivka, Donetsk Oblast, Ukraine
- Burial place: Forest Cemetery, Kyiv, Ukraine
- Military career
- Allegiance: Ukraine
- Branch: Ukrainian Ground Forces
- Service years: 2014 – 2023
- Rank: Polkovnyk
- Units: Ukrainian Ground Forces; Ukrainian Volunteer Corps; 28th Mechanized Brigade
- Conflicts: Russo-Ukrainian War; War in Donbas; Anti Terrorist Operation; Russian invasion of Ukraine; Battle of Bakhmut †
- Awards

Serhii Volodymyrovych Ilnytskyi (Ukrainian: Сергій Володимирович Ільницький; 20 May 1970 – 22 August 2023) was a Ukrainian colonel, politician, public figure and athlete. He was a participant in the Russian-Ukrainian war and later died in the Russian invasion of Ukraine starting in 2022.

== Biography ==
Ilnytskyi was born in Kyiv on 20 May 1970, and attended schools No. 143 and 168 of Kyiv. Later he graduated from the Kyiv Air Defense Engineering Radio Technical School and the National Defense University of Ukraine, and received a master's degree in Public Administration from the Lviv State Institute of Public Administration.

He had participated in Anti Terrorist Operation in Donbas since 2014. During the campaign, he was injured and disabled in a battle. He was later awarded the Third-Degree Order of Merit.

When Russia launched a full-scale invasion of Ukraine in 2022, he joined the army again. In 2023, he was appointed deputy commander of the Ukrainian Volunteer Corps and commander of the "Southern" detachment of the 28th Mechanized Brigade.

On 22 August 2023, Ilnytskyi was found dead near the village of Kurdiumivka in Donetsk Oblast. On August 28, 2023, Archbishop Ahapit presided over the funeral at St. Michael's Golden-Domed Monastery and was later buried in the Forest Cemetery, Kyiv.
