= Valerii Hliebov =

Ukrainian soldier (1970–2022)

- Валерій Глєбов
- Born: 3 October 1970; Okhtyrka, Sumy Oblast, Ukrainian SSR, Soviet Union
- Died: 24 November 2022 (aged 52); Near Bakhmut, Donetsk Oblast, Ukraine
- Children: 1
- Military career
- Allegiance: Ukraine
- Branch: Armed Forces of Ukraine
- Rank: Captain
- Unit: 93rd Mechanized Brigade (Ukraine)
- Conflicts: Russo-Ukrainian War; Russian invasion of Ukraine
- Awards: Order of the Gold Star (posthumously)

Valerii Vasyliovych Hliebov (Ukrainian: Валерій Васильович Глєбов; October 3, 1970 — November 24, 2022) was a captain of the Armed Forces of Ukraine who died during the Russian invasion of Ukraine, a Hero of Ukraine with the Order of the Golden Star, and a participant in the Russian-Ukrainian war.

== Biography ==
Valerii Hliebov was born on October 3, 1970, in Okhtyrka, Sumy region. He volunteered for the ATO in eastern Ukraine. From a soldier he rose to the rank of captain," the 93rd Brigade Kholodnyi Yar's Facebook page reported. From the first day of the full-scale war, Captain Valerii Hliebov defended Okhtyrka and participated in the liberation of Trostyanets. Then he served as a company commander of the 93rd Cold Yar Brigade and fought near Izyum in Kharkiv region. Together with the battalion, the company commanded by Valerii Hliebov fought for a week for an important crossroads in front of Bakhmut, holding the city's defense. Valerii Hliebov died on November 24, 2022, from a mortar attack by the Russian occupiers at the age of 53 near the village of Pidhorodne, Soledar City Community, Bakhmut District, Donetsk Region. The funeral service for the officer took place on November 28, 2022, at the Assumption Church. The deceased was buried in his native Okhtyrka.

== Family ==
The deceased is survived by his mother and daughter.

== Awards ==
- The title of Hero of Ukraine with the Order "Golden Star" (May 5, 2023, posthumously) — for personal courage and heroism displayed in the defense of state sovereignty and territorial integrity of Ukraine, selfless service to the Ukrainian people.
- The Order "For Courage", III class (October 31, 2022) — for personal courage and selfless actions in the defense of state sovereignty and territorial integrity of Ukraine, loyalty to the military oath.
- "Defender of the Motherland" Medal (March 13, 2022) — for personal courage and selfless actions in the defense of state sovereignty and territorial integrity of Ukraine, loyalty to the military oath.
