= Serhii Konoval =

Ukrainian public activist, paramedic, soldier (1992–2024)

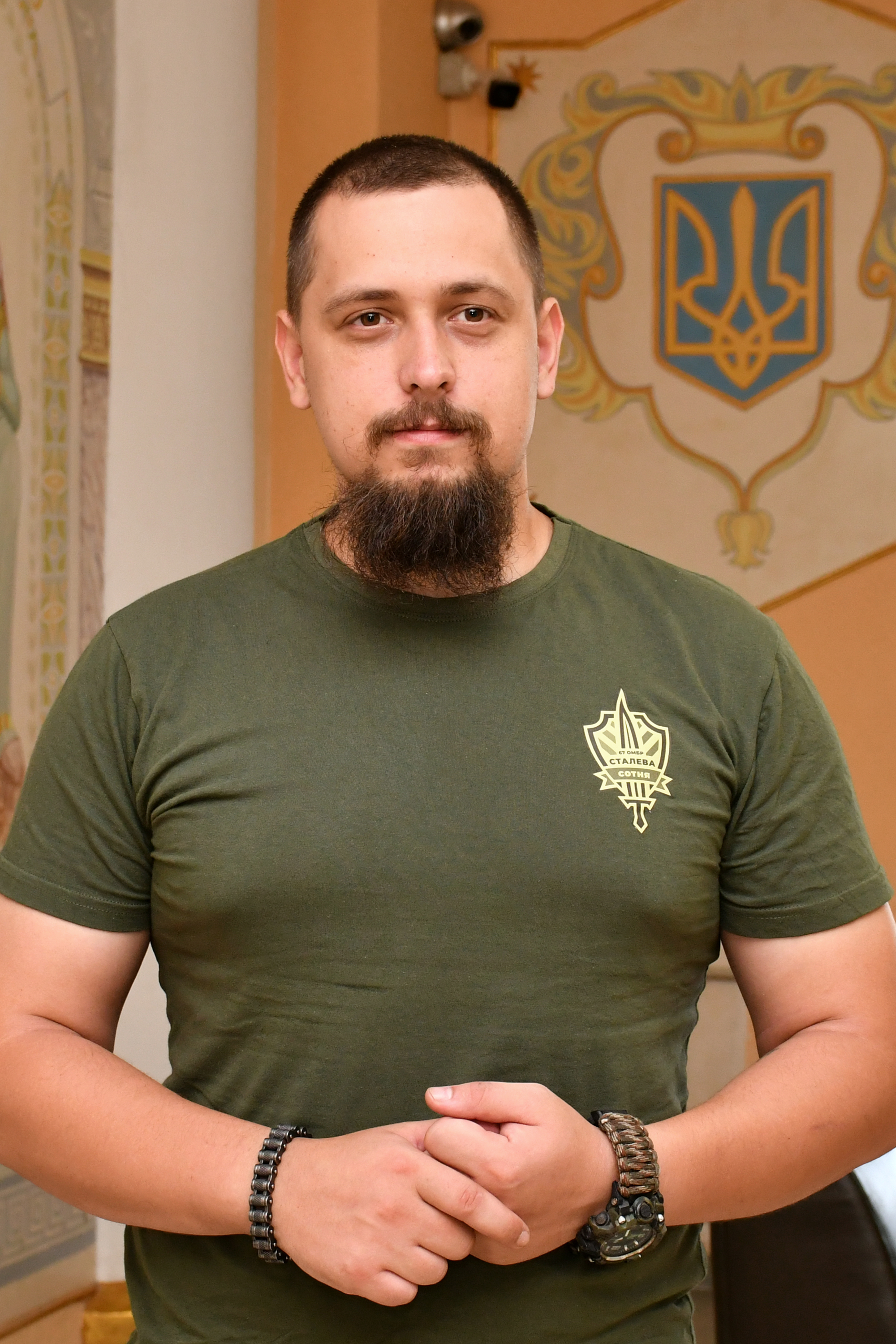
- Native name: Сергій Коновал
- Nickname: Норд (Nord)
- Born: Serhii Serhiiovych Konoval
- Allegiance: Ukraine
- Branch: Armed Forces of Ukraine
- Rank: Junior lieutenant
- Conflicts: Russo-Ukrainian War
- Awards: Hero of Ukraine; Order for Courage

Serhii Serhiiovych Konoval (Ukrainian: Сергій Сергійович Коновал; 29 May 1992, Ternopil – 6 April 2024, near Chasiv Yar, Donetsk Oblast) was a Ukrainian public activist, Plast member, paramedic, serviceman, junior lieutenant of the Armed Forces of Ukraine, participant of the Russian-Ukrainian war. Hero of Ukraine (2024, posthumously).

== Biography ==
Serhii Konoval was born on 29 May 1992 in Ternopil.

He studied at Ternopil secondary school No. 19. He graduated from the Ternopil National Medical University with a degree in dentistry.

A member of the Order of the Crusaders, a participant of the Revolution of Dignity. From March 2014, he was a paramedic of the volunteer medical battalion "Hospitallers" of the Right Sector, and later – the commander of the 6th Reserve Hundred of the Right Sector. He participated in the battles for Stanytsia Luhanska, Pisky, and Mariinka.

One of the founders of the "House of Veterans" in Ternopil. He worked as the head of the department of the Ternopil Regional Youth Methodological Center. Co-organizer of national and patriotic events. In 2018, he took part in a charity bike ride across 20 US states in support of Ukraine.

During the full-scale Russian invasion, he served as the commander of the 2nd Infantry Company "Steel Hundred" of the 2nd Infantry Battalion named after T. Hammer of the 67th Mechanized Brigade. He participated in the battles for Kyiv, Kharkiv, Donetsk and Bakhmut. Later he fought in the Liman direction. He died on 6 April 2024, together with his comrade Taras Petryshyn near the town of Chasiv Yar, Donetsk Oblast.

The funeral service for Serhii Konoval and Taras Petryshyn took place on 9 April 2024 on Independence Square in Kyiv.

He was buried on 10 April 2024 at the Mykulynetsky Cemetery in Ternopil.

== Family ==
In January 2024, he married volunteer Olha Danchenko.

== Works ==
He was a cameraman and co-producer of the films "Shliakh pokolin", "Doroha v Karpatakh", "Trokhy nyzhche neba". He shot a music video about Ternopil for the song of the local band "Kozhen z nas".

== Awards ==
- the title of Hero of Ukraine with the Order of the Golden Star (23 August 2024, posthumously)
- Order for Courage, 3rd class (14 March 2023)
- Order of the Knight's Cross of the Volunteer (14 October 2019)
- ATO Volunteer medal
- Fighter, veteran of the Right Sector military group
- Iron Plast Cross (2024, posthumously)

== Commemorations ==
On 10 April 2024, he was honored with a moment of silence in the Missouri Senate.
