= Oleksandr Makhov =

Ukrainian journalist and serviceman (1986–2022)

- Олександр Махов
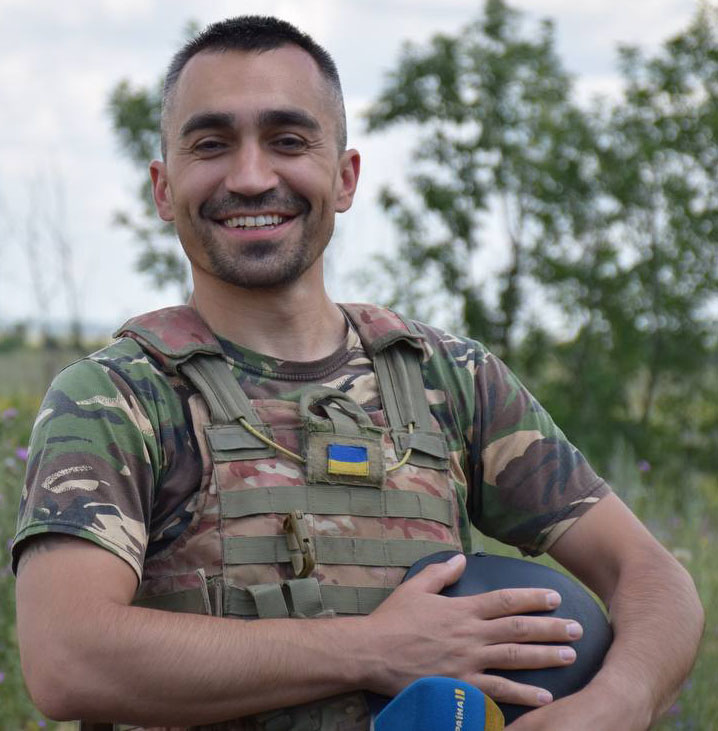

Personal details
- Born: Oleksandr Volodymyrovych Makhov; 17 April 1986 Voroshylovhrad
- Died: 4 May 2022 (aged 36) Dovhenke, Kharkiv Oblast
- Education: East Ukrainian Volodymyr Dahl National University
- Nickname: Журналіст (Zhurnalist)

Military service
- Allegiance: Ukraine
- Branch/service: Armed Forces of Ukraine
- Rank: Sergeant
- Battles/wars: Russo-Ukrainian War
- Awards: Order for Courage

Oleksandr Volodymyrovych Makhov (Ukrainian: Олександр Володимирович Махов, 17 April 1986 – 4 May 2022) was a Ukrainian serviceman, sergeant of the Armed Forces of Ukraine, military journalist, participant of the Russian-Ukrainian war.

== Biography ==
Oleksandr Makhov was born on 17 April 1986 in Voroshylovhrad (now Luhansk).

He graduated from the East Ukrainian Volodymyr Dahl National University with a degree in journalism. He worked for Luhansk Regional Television, the city's IRTA channel, and as a correspondent for Ukraine, Ukraine 24, and Dom TV channels (2021–2022). He covered events from the war zone and hosted the podcast "Viiskkor". In 2017, he had a business trip to Antarctica.

In 2015, he was voluntarily mobilized, served as an anti-aircraft gunner and machine gunner in the 57th Motorized Brigade. He participated in the fighting near Horlivka – in Zaitseve and Maiorsk.

From 20 February to 5 March 2020, he was the only representative of the Ukrainian media in the observation center in Novi Sanzhary, Poltava Oblast, together with the evacuees from Wuhan, China.

With the beginning of the full-scale Russian invasion of Ukraine in 2022, he went to the front again as part of the 95th Air Assault Brigade. He died on 4 May 2022 while defending the village of Dovhenke, Kharkiv Oblast, as a result of shelling by the Russian occupiers. An enemy fragment hit Oleksandr's lung.

He was buried on 9 May 2022 at the Berkovets Cemetery.

He is survived by his son Vladyslav and his fiancée Anastasiia Blyshchyk, herself a journalist, and a soldier of the Armed Forces of Ukraine.

== Legacy ==
On 5 May 2022, President of Ukraine Volodymyr Zelenskyi began his address with the news of the journalist's death.

A light rail station in Kyiv was also named after him.

On 26 December 2022, in Izium, Kharkiv Oblast, Oleksandr Ostrovskyi Street was renamed to Oleksandr Makhov Street.

On 27 October 2022, Oleksandr Makhov Street appeared in Kyiv.

== Awards ==
- Order for Courage, III class (24 May 2022, posthumously)
