= 148th Artillery Brigade =

148th Artillery Brigade (2023–) 148th Howitzer Self-propelled Artillery Divizion (2015–2023)
- 148-ма окрема артилерійська бригада
- Active: 2015–present
- Country: Ukraine
- Allegiance: Armed Forces of Ukraine
- Branch: Ukrainian Air Assault Forces
- Type: Rocket and Artillery Forces
- Role: Artillery
- Size: Brigade
- Part of: 8th Air Assault Corps
- Garrison/HQ: Zhytomyr, Zhytomyr Oblast
- Nickname: Zhytomyr brigade
- Motto: Flame of victory
- Engagements: Russo-Ukrainian War: War in Donbas; Full scale invasion
- Decorations: For Courage and Bravery

Commanders
- Current commander: Colonel Maksym Lanovyi

Insignia
- Flag

The 148th Artillery Brigade Zhytomyr formerly called as the 148th Howitzer Self-propelled Artillery Divizion is an artillery brigade of the Ukrainian Air Assault Forces and till 2023, it was subordinated to the 81st Airmobile Brigade. Based at the city of Zhytomyr, it bears its honorary name from the namesake city.

== History ==
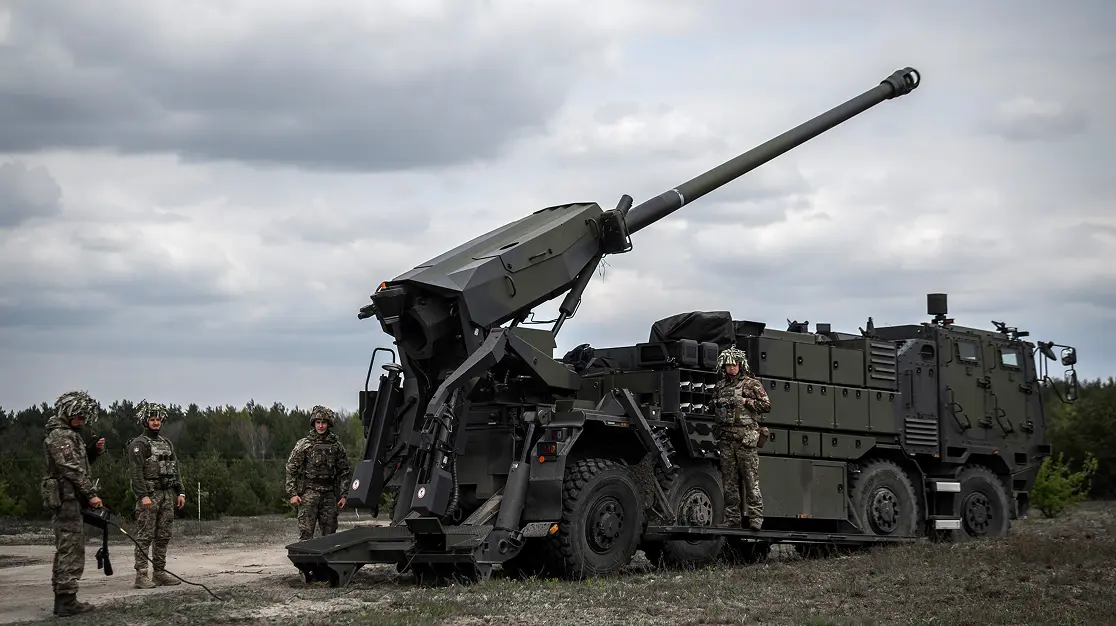
CAESAR self-propelled howitzer of the brigade

The 148th brigade was initially created as the 148th Artillery Divizion in March 2015 as a part of the 81st Airmobile Brigade at the city of Druzhkivka and immediately started combat operations during the War in Donbas starting in July 2015 by providing artillery support during the Battle of Donetsk Airport. On 6 December 2021, while operating in Kramatorsk, the divizion was presented with a combat flag.

In March 2022, it saw combat in the village of Sholomky with a soldier of the divizion (Andriy Tarasovych) being killed in action on 2 March while providing combat support. AeroVironment RQ-20 Puma UAVs arrived in April 2022 as foreign aid during the Russian invasion of Ukraine. On November 17, 2022, the divizion was awarded the honorary award "For Courage and Bravery". On 4 September 2023, the divizion became a brigade and was announced to be operating in Zaporizhzhia Oblast as a part of the Tavria operational-strategic group carrying out artillery strikes using M777 howitzers. On August 23, 2024, the brigade was awarded the honorary title of "Zhytomyr".

== Equipment ==
The brigade operates artillery pieces, mostly the M777 howitzer and CAESAR self-propelled howitzer, as well as UAVs such as the AeroVironment RQ-20 Puma.
