= Yevhen Hulevych =

Ukrainian philosopher (1975–2022)

Yevhen Vasylovych Hulevych
- Євген Васильович Гулевич
- Born: 21 July 1975; Lviv, Ukrainian SSR (now Ukraine)
- Died: 31 December 2022 (aged 47) near Bakhmut, Donetsk Oblast
- Education: University of Lviv
- Awards: Order for Courage

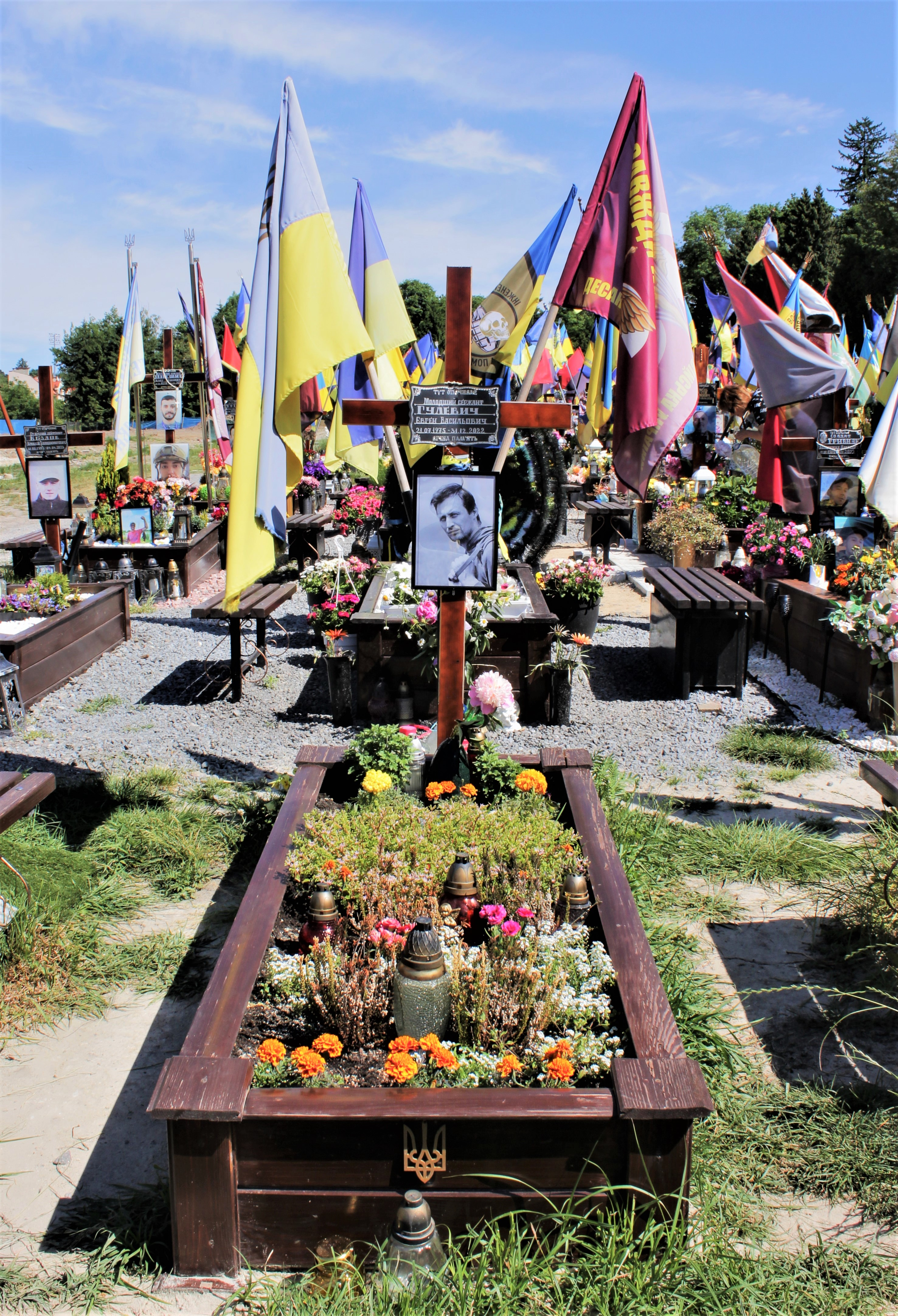
Grave of Yevhen Hulevych

Yevhen Vasylovych Hulevych (Ukrainian: Євген Васильович Гулевич; 21 July 1975 – 31 December 2022) was a Ukrainian philosopher, translator, philologist, cultural historian, soldier, junior sergeant of the 46th Airmobile Brigade of the Armed Forces of Ukraine, a participant in the Russian-Ukrainian war.

== Biography ==
Yevhen Vasylovych Hulevych was born on 21 July 1975 in Lviv. As a child, he attended theater and art classes.

Hulevych studied at Kalush Secondary School No. 2 and graduated from the Faculty of Journalism at Ivan Franko National University of Lviv (2000). Subsequently, he decided to continue his studies for a master's degree in cultural studies (2005).

Hulevych has worked as a journalist for the Lviv newspapers Expres and Postup; a translator for the Perekladatska maisternist and Universytetski dialohy (under the direction of Mariia Hablevych); and the director (2010–2015)[2] of the Center for Humanities Research at Lviv National University. Hulevych was proficient in Spanish.

=== Russian invasion of Ukraine (2022) ===
After the start of the full-scale Russian invasion, he joined the Armed Forces of Ukraine. Served as a machine gunner with the 46th separate airmobile brigade, and was wounded twice.

Died on 31 December 2022 from a Russian sniper's bullet near Bakhmut, Donetsk Oblast. He was reported missing. Due to constant shelling, the body was recovered only at the end of March 2023.

Buried on 10 April 2023 on the Field of Honorary Burial No. 86A of the Lychakiv Cemetery.

== Works ==
The author of cultural and critical publications; a collection of articles dedicated to the Ukrainian writer Solomiia Pavlychko. He was involved in the Istorii literatury project, in which he fully demonstrated his abilities.

He has translated into Ukrainian books by José Luis Ramírez "La existencia de la ironía como ironía de la existencia", Ray Bradbury "Something Bad is Coming", Raphael Shacter "The World Atlas of Street Art and Graffiti" (editor-in-chief), Neale Donald Walsch "Conversations with God".

A co-author of cultural and artistic projects, including "Sviato muzyky", "My future heritage", "Pinzel AR", "Anhely" (2019, under the direction of Pavlo Hudimov), "Ahora", "Sumizhnist" (2021). He is one of the co-authors of the documentary "Vypchyna. Selo odnoho dnia" (2019).

== Awards ==
- Order for Courage, 3rd class (26 July 2023, posthumously)
- Honorary Citizen of Kalush Urban Territorial Hromada (11 September 2023, posthumously)

== Commemorating ==
In October 2023, he became one of the heroes of the photo exhibition "Chest. Myzhnist. Shliakhetnist" at the Ivan Franko National University of Lviv.

On 16 May 2024, during the opening of the Lviv Media Forum, a multichannel audiovisual installation "Vahome nevymovne" dedicated to Yevhen Hulevych was shown.
