= Mykhailo Matiushenko =

Ukrainian military aviator (1961–2022)

- Михайло Матюшенко
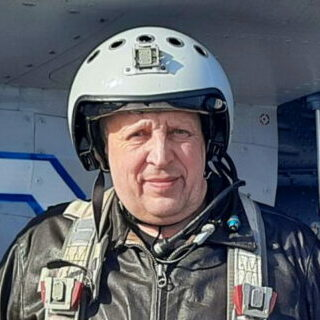
- Born: Mykhailo Yuriiovych Matiushenko; 8 January 1961; Kharkiv, Soviet Union
- Died: 26 June 2022 (aged 61) over the Black Sea
- Military career
- Allegiance: Ukraine
- Branch: Ukrainian Air Force
- Service years: 1983–1991 (USSR); 2014–2022 (Ukraine)
- Rank: Colonel
- Nickname: Дід (Did)
- Conflicts: Russo-Ukrainian War
- Awards: Hero of Ukraine

Mykhailo Yuriiovych Matiushenko (Ukrainian: Михайло Юрійович Матюшенко, call sign – Did; 8 January 1961 in Kharkiv, Soviet Union – 26 June 2022 over the Black Sea, Ukraine) was a Ukrainian entrepreneur and manager, serviceman, military and civil aviation pilot, colonel and commander of the 40th Tactical Aviation Brigade of the Air Force of the Armed Forces of Ukraine, who participated in the Russo-Ukrainian War. Hero of Ukraine (2023, posthumously).

== Biography ==
Mykhailo Matiushenko was born on 8 January 1961 in Kharkiv. In his youth, he went in for swimming, became a master of sports, and was a children's coach.

He graduated with honors from the Hrytsevets Kharkiv Higher Military School of Pilots and also from the Gagarin Air Force Academy in Moscow. He served in the USSR until 1991.

After the collapse of the USSR, he decided to serve Ukraine. Then he resigned from military service and worked in commercial structures related to civil aviation. In the 2000s, he headed one of Kyiv's airlines. In 2014, he traveled to the east as a volunteer. Later, he became a pilot-instructor in one of the military aviation brigades of Ukraine.

In 2018, he retired from military service and headed a commercial enterprise that operated in the field of agricultural aviation, and later in passenger transportation. He flew many types of military and civilian aircraft.

He commanded the 40th Tactical Aviation Brigade.

In March 2022, he returned to the Armed Forces of Ukraine. After Russian forces retreated from northern Ukraine, Matiushenko converted from the MiG-29 fighter to the Sukhoi Su-24 bomber.

He died on the morning of June 26, 2022 in the sky over the Black Sea near Zmiinyi Island during a combat mission. His body was found in Bulgaria. It is likely that his Su-24 was shot down by a Pantsyr-S1 anti-aircraft missile system. Major Yurii Krasylnikov was killed along with him, and his body has not yet been found.

He was buried on 3 October 2022 on the Alley of Heroes in Bucha.

== Awards ==
- The title of Hero of Ukraine with the "Order of the Gold Star" (2023, posthumously).

== Honoring the memory ==
External videos
- Загинув вчитель «київських привидів»: історія льотчика Михайла Матюшенка on YouTube // ТСН. — 2022. — 13 жовтня.

On 12 April 2023, in the city of Bucha, Warriors of the Internationalists Street was renamed Mykhailo Matyushenko Street.

== See also ==
- Oleksandr Oksanchenko (Grey wolf)
- Andrii Pilshchykov (Juice)
- Stepan Tarabalka
- Ghost of Kyiv
