= Grygorii Tsekhmistrenko =

Ukrainian volunteer medic, soldier (1994–2023)

- Григорій Цехмістренко
- Born: Grygorii Vitaliiovych Tsekhmistrenko; 19 December 1994; Rivne, Ukraine
- Died: 15 January 2023 (aged 28)
- Other names: Ґреґ (Greg)
- Occupations: volunteer medic, soldier
- Awards: Order for Courage

Grygorii Vitaliiovych Tsekhmistrenko (Ukrainian: Григорій Віталійович Цехмістренко; 19 December 1994 – 15 January 2023) was a Canadian civic activist, volunteer medic of Ukrainian origin, a soldier of the International Legion of the Territorial Defense of the Armed Forces of Ukraine, and a participant in the Russian-Ukrainian war.

== Biography ==
Tsekhmistrenko was born on 19 December 1994 in Rivne. He studied at school #89 in the Pecherskyi district of Kyiv. For many years he lived with his parents in Kinistino, Saskatchewan, Canada. Later, he moved to Port Alice, British Columbia, Canada. He had Canadian citizenship.

He was a participant of the Revolution of Dignity. On 18 February 2014, during a "peaceful march" to the Verkhovna Rada of Ukraine, security forces beat and detained many activists. Among the victims, Tsekhmistrenko was detained in the Desnianskyi district police station.

After the start of the full-scale Russian invasion, he took part in combat operations as part of the Azov Regiment; since April 2022, he has been a volunteer medic with the International Legion of the Armed Forces of Ukraine. He saved the lives of Ukrainian soldiers and civilians in Bucha, Hostomel, Moshchun, Enerhodar, Lysychansk, Kherson, and Bakhmut. Tsekhmistrenko died on 15 January 2023 near the city of Bakhmut, Donetsk Oblast.

He was buried on 20 January 2023 in Chabany, Kyiv Oblast.

The son of Vitalii Tsekhmistrenko, the founder of the Rise agricultural holding, who was among the 200 richest Ukrainians. His fortune was estimated at $291 million.

== Awards ==
In 2023, he was posthumously awarded the Order for Courage, 3rd class.

== Honoring his memory ==
School No. 89 in the Pechersk district of Kyiv, where he studied, is to be named after him. The initiative was supported by Lieutenant General Kyrylo Budanov, Chief of the Defence Intelligence of Ukraine.

He is one of the heroes of the exhibition "Steel Titans of Bakhmut" at the National Museum of the History of Ukraine in the Second World War.
