= Yurii Krasylnikov =

Ukrainian military aviators (?-2022)

- Юрій Красильніков
- Born: Yurii Mykolaiovych Krasylnikov
- Died: 26 June 2022 over the Black Sea
- Military career
- Allegiance: Ukraine
- Branch: Ukrainian Air Force
- Rank: Major
- Conflicts: Russo-Ukrainian War
- Awards: Hero of Ukraine

Yurii Mykolaiovych Krasylnikov (Ukrainian: Юрій Миколайович Красильніков) was a military pilot, Major of the Armed Forces of Ukraine and a participant of the Russo-Ukrainian War. Hero of Ukraine (posthumously, 2023).

== Biography ==
During the Russian invasion of Ukraine in 2022, he served with the 40th Tactical Aviation Brigade of the Armed Forces of Ukraine.

On the morning of 26 June 2022, as a navigator of a Sukhoi Su-24 aircraft under the command of Colonel Mykhailo Matiushenko, he performed a combat mission near Zmiinyi Island. After bombing Russian forces on Zmiinyi Island, their plane was hit by enemy air defense systems and crashed in the Black Sea near the island. Subsequently, the body of Mykhailo Matyushenko was found in Bulgaria, while the body of Yurii Krasylnikov has not yet been found.

== Awards ==
- The title of Hero of Ukraine with the "Order of the Gold Star" (2023, posthumously)

On 6 August 2023, President of Ukraine Volodymyr Zelenskyy presented the "Order of the Golden Star" to Yurii Krasylnikov's family during the celebrations of the Day of the Air Force of the Armed Forces of Ukraine.
