= Dmytro Maslovskyi =

Ukrainian soldier (1994–2024)

Dmytro Olehovych Maslovskyi (Ukrainian: Дмитро Олегович Масловський; callsign Kobra; 7 November 1994 — 17 November 2024) was a Ukrainian serviceman, participant in the Russian-Ukrainian war. Hero of Ukraine (2025, posthumously).

== Biography ==
Born on 7 November 1994 in the village of Yanyshivka in the Podilskyi Raion, Odesa Oblast.

From 2017 to 2020, he participated in the Joint Forces Operation.

In 2023, he was mobilized for military service. He served in the 71st Separate Jaeger Brigade. He participated in battles in the Donetsk, Kharkiv, and Zaporizhzhia directions.

== Death ==
Died on 17 November 2024, in the village of Trudove in Donetsk region as a result of a knife fight with a Russian soldier Andrei Grigoriev.

== Awards ==
- Title of Hero of Ukraine with the Order of the Gold Star (16 January 2025, posthumously) — *for personal courage and heroism shown in defending the state sovereignty and territorial integrity of Ukraine, selfless service to the Ukrainian people*.
- Distinguished Presidential Award "For the Defense of Ukraine".
