= Dovhenke, Izium Raion, Kharkiv Oblast =

Dovhenke Довгеньке
- Village
- Location in Ukraine Dovhenke (Kharkiv Oblast)
- Coordinates: 49°01′06″N 37°19′09″E
- Country: Ukraine
- Oblast: Kharkiv Oblast
- Raion: Izium Raion
- Elevation: 183 m (600 ft)

Population
  - Total: 850
- Postal Code: 64371

Dovhenke (Ukrainian: Довгеньке) is a selo in Izium Raion, Kharkiv Oblast, Ukraine. It belongs to Oskil rural hromada, one of the hromadas of Ukraine. Dovhenke had a pre-war population of 850 people.

The village is very close to the border between Kharkiv Oblast and Donetsk Oblast, and it is located approximately 26 kilometers south of the city of Izium. The village has road access to Highway M03, which connects Kharkiv and Sloviansk.

During the 2022 Russian invasion of Ukraine, in the Battle of Dovhenke Russia took the village at some moment before 11 June. By 12 June, Ukraine reported the Russian army was conducting an assault from Dovhenke towards Mazanivka and Dolina, indicating the village had been captured by Russian forces. Fighting for the village restarted on 5 August as Ukrainian forces started a new counteroffensive near Izium.
