= Kurdiumivka =

Urban locality in Donetsk Oblast, Ukraine

Kurdiumivka Курдюмівка
- Rural settlement
- Location of Kurdiumivka within Ukraine Kurdiumivka (Ukraine)
- Coordinates: 48.468333°N 37.96°E
- Country: Ukraine
- Oblast: Donetsk Oblast
- Raion: Bakhmut Raion
- Hromada: Toretsk urban hromada
- Founded: 1936

Area
  - Total: 0.57 km^{2} (0.22 sq mi)
- Elevation: 206 m (676 ft)

Population (2022)
  - Total: 737
  - Density: 1,300/km^{2} (3,300/sq mi)
- Time zone: UTC+2 (EET)
  - Summer (DST): UTC+3 (EEST)
- Postal code: 85285
- Area code: +380 6247

Kurdiumivka (Ukrainian: Курдюмівка; Russian: Курдюмовка) is a rural settlement in Bakhmut Raion, Donetsk Oblast in eastern Ukraine. It is located 54.7 kilometres (34.0 mi) north-northeast from the centre of Donetsk city. Population: 737 (2022 estimate).

== History ==
=== 20th century ===
Kurdiumivka was founded in 1936, growing up around a railway station. During World War II, Kurdiumivka was occupied by Nazi Germany between October 1941 and September 1943. In 1957, it received rural settlement status. Its population slowly shrank throughout the second half of the 20th century.

=== 21st century ===
The war in Donbas that started in mid-April 2014, brought both civilian and military casualties. A civilian was killed by rebel shelling in Kurdiumivka on 6 February 2017. During the full-scale Russian invasion of Ukraine that began in 2022, Kurdiumivka was a site of fighting during the Battle of Bakhmut.

== Demographics ==
In 2001 the settlement had 1161 inhabitants. Native language as of the Ukrainian Census of 2001:

- Ukrainian — 51.25%
- Russian — 48.49%
