= Kyiv National Academic Theatre of Operetta =

Theatre in Kyiv, Ukraine

Coordinates: 50°26′1″N 30°30′59″E

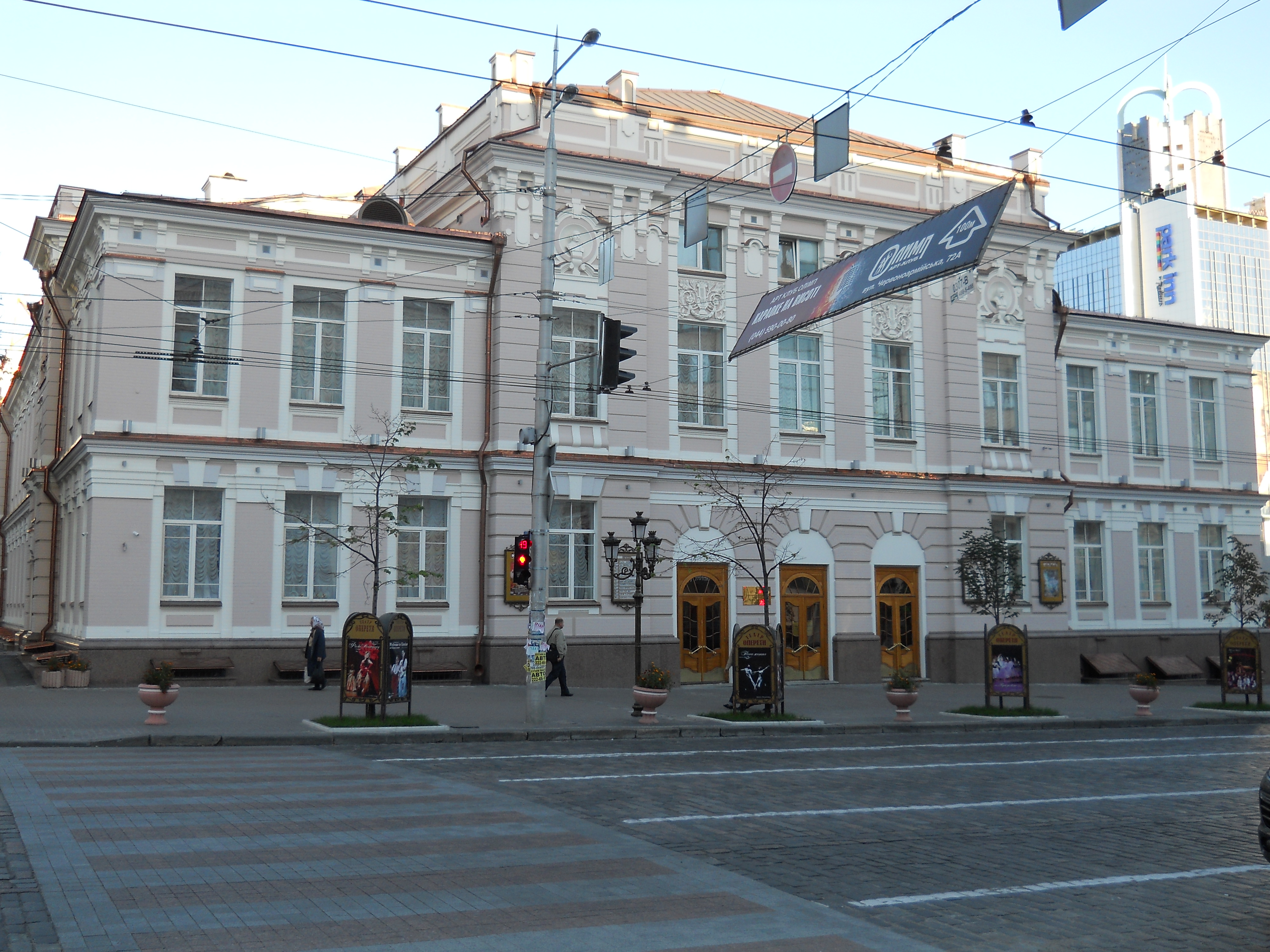
Kyiv National Academic Theatre of Operetta

The Kyiv National Theatre of Operetta (Ukrainian: Київський національний академічний театр оперети, romanized: Kyivskyi natsionalnyi akademichnyi teatr operety) is a theatre in Kyiv in Ukraine. It was founded in 1934.
