= Pavlo Zuyev =

Ukrainian military officer

- Павло Павлович Зуєв
- Born: Pavlo Pavlovych Zuyev; 8 May 1962 (age 64); Bobarika, Minsk Oblast, Soviet Union
- Military career
- Allegiance: Ukraine
- Branch: Ukrainian Air Force
- Service years: 1992-2015
- Rank: Liutenant General
- Commands: Air Command South

Pavlo Pavlovych Zuyev (Ukrainian: Павло Павлович Зуєв; born on 8 May 1962), is a Belarusian-born Ukrainian army officer who is the acting head of the Military Service of Law Enforcement in the Armed Forces of Ukraine - Chief of the Main Directorate of the Military Law Enforcement Service of the Armed Forces of Ukraine since July 2021.

He had served as the commander of the Air Command South from 2008 to 2017.

He is a lieutenant general as of 2011, and is a Candidate of Technical Sciences.

== Biography ==
Pavlo Zuyev was born on 8 May 1962 in Bobarika, Krupsky district, Minsk Region.

In 1984 he graduated from the Minsk Higher Engineering Aircraft Missile School. He started the officer service by the head of the radio technical department. From 1984 to 1994 he served in positions of the head of the radio technical department, the deputy commander of the armaments division - commander of the radiotechnical battery, commander of the anti -aircraft missile division, commander of a separate anti -aircraft missile division.

In 1996, he graduated from Kharkiv Military University. He then served as a senior officer of the Department of Combat Training of the Department of FRM 28 Air Defense Corps, Chief of Staff - Deputy Commander of the 1200 Anti -Witcheth Missile Regiment 28 Air Defense Corps, commander of 1200 anti -aircraft missile regiment 28 of the Air Defense Corps, commander of the 6222th Corps - Deputy Chief of Operational Department of the headquarters 28 of the air defense building.

In 2007, he was promoted to Major General, while he was the chief of staff-the first deputy commander of the Air Command Center.

In October 2008, he became the commander of Air Command South.

On 23 December 2017, he was replaced by his successor, Vasyl Chernenko, and at the same time, he became theDeputy Command Commander - Head of Combat Training Department of the Armed Forces Command of the Armed Forces of Ukraine.

In 2020, he was appointed Deputy Chief of the General Staff of the Armed Forces of Ukraine.
