= Dmytro Karpenko =

Ukrainian army officer

- Дмитро Володимирович Карпенко
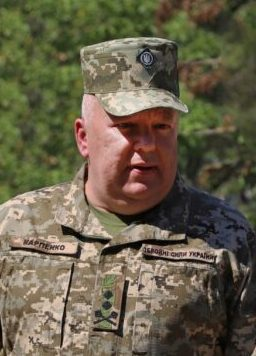
- Major General Dmytro Karpenko, 2023
- Born: Dmytro Volodymyrovych Karpenko; Soviet Union
- Military career
- Allegiance: Ukraine
- Branch: Ukrainian Air Force
- Service years: 2012-
- Commands: Air Command South
- Conflicts: Russo-Ukrainian War

Dmytro Volodymyrovych Karpenko (Ukrainian: Дмитро Володимирович Карпенко), is a Ukrainian army officer who is currently the commander of the Air Command South since 2022. A participant in the Russian-Ukrainian war, he had been the Chief of Staff – First Deputy Commander of the Air Command West from 2018 to 2022. In 2012 he became a Major General.

== Biography ==
On 6 December 2012, he was appointed Chief of the Anti-Aircraft Missile Forces of the Air Force of the Armed Forces of Ukraine.

In 2018, Karpenko was appointed Chief of Staff - First Deputy Commander of the Air Command West.

In 2022, Karpenko was appointed Air Command South's commander, replacing Vasyl Chernenko.

In December 2025, Ukrainian President Zelenskyy announced discussions to replace Karpenko.
