= 138th Radio Technical Brigade =

- 138-ма радіотехнічна бригада
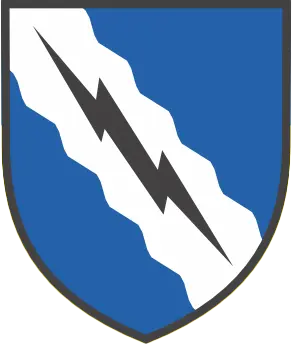
- Insignia of the Ukrainian 138th Radio Technical Brigade
- Active: 1992 – present
- Country: Ukraine
- Allegiance: Ukraine
- Branch: Ukrainian Air Force
- Type: Radar
- Role: Radar, Reconnaissance, Air Traffic Control, UAV operations
- Part of: Air Command Center
- Garrison/HQ: Vasylkiv
- Mottos: "Vigilance, reliability, professionalism!"
- Equipment: P37, P18-"Malachite", 79k6-"Pelikan", 80K6KS1-"Fenix-1"
- Engagements: Russo-Ukrainian war: War in Donbas; Russian invasion of Ukraine

Commanders
- Current commander: Colonel Perepelitsa Yury Leonidovych

Insignia
- Former Insignia

The 138th Radio Technical Brigade is a Brigade of the Ukrainian Air Force concerned with radar operations in Vinnytsia, Kyiv, Zhytomyr, Cherkasy, Kirovohrad, Poltava, Chernihiv and Sumy Oblasts and is subordinated to the Air Command Center. It is headquartered in Vasylkiv and operates many radar systems including the P37, P18-"Malachite", 79k6-"Pelikan", 80K6KS1-"Fenix-1".

== History ==
In 1992, following the Dissolution of the Soviet union, the 138th Radio Technical Brigade of the Soviet Army swore allegiance to Ukraine becoming a part of its armed forces.

The brigade's personnel have been participating in the War in Donbas since 2015. In addition to radar and reconnaissance operations, it also saw action in the operations of FPV drones. On 25 February 2017, a soldier of the brigade (Dmytro Oleksandrovich Ponomarenko) was killed by a gunshot while operating a UAV in Verkhniotoretske. On 22 April 2017, the brigade's positions were shelled by separatists killing a soldier of the brigade (Pavlo Yuriyovych Smirnov) who was serving on an observational and reconnaissance mission.

On 10 October 2018, a soldier of the brigade (Dronov Serhii Anatoliyovych) was killed as a result of a mine explosion while operating near Hranitne.

On 2 September 2019, a soldier of the brigade was killed by a sniper near Vodiane which was followed by continued separatist bombardment on the positions in Vodiane.

At the start of the Russian invasion of Ukraine, the brigade defended the Ukrainian capital Kyiv by providing radar coverage and UAV support to Ukrainian Forces during the Battle of Kyiv.

== Structure ==
- 138th Radio Technical Brigade
  - 69th Radio Engineering Battalion (Vinnytsia)
  - 102nd Radio Engineering Battalion (Kyiv)
    - 10th Separate Radar Company (Brovary)
    - 752nd Separate Radar Company (Nizhyn)
    - 550th Separate Radar Company (Chernihiv)
    - 747th Separate Radar Company (Zhashkiv)
  - 115th Radio Engineering Battalion (Smila)
    - 548th Separate Radar Company (Kropyvnytskyi)
    - 551st Separate Radar Company (Konotop)
    - 786th separate Radar Company (Hrebinka)
  - 116th Radio Engineering Battalion (Uman)
    - 688th Separate Radar Company (Karpivka)
    - 750th Separate Radar Company (Tulchyn)
  - 133rd Radio Engineering Battalion (Ozerne)
    - 746th Separate Radar Company (Popilnya)
    - 748th Separate Radar Company (Bohonyky)

== Commanders ==
- Colonel Ihor Karkyshchenko (?-2016)
- Colonel Volodymyr Hnyria (2016–2019)
- Colonel Perepelitsa Yury Leonidovych (2019-)

== Sources ==
- Військові частини Повітряних Сил за родами військ
