= 14th Radio Technical Brigade =

- 14-та радіотехнічна бригада
- Active: 1992 – present
- Country: Ukraine
- Allegiance: Armed Forces of Ukraine
- Branch: Ukrainian Air Force
- Type: Brigade
- Role: Radio Technical Troops
- Part of: Air Command South
- Garrison/HQ: Odesa
- Nickname: Bohdan Khmelnytsky
- Patron: Bohdan Khmelnytsky
- Mottos: Latin: OMNI VIDENS; English: We see everything!
- Engagements: Russo-Ukrainian war: War in Donbas; Russian invasion of Ukraine
- Decorations: For Courage and Bravery

Commanders
- Current commander: Colonel Hrytsaenko Serhii Anatoliyovych
- Notable commanders: Lieutenant Colonel Klimov Serhiy Borisovych

Insignia
- Field Insignia

The 14th Radio Technical Brigade Bohdan Khmelnytskyi is a Brigade of the Ukrainian Air Force concerned with radar operations in South Ukraine and is subordinated to the Air Command South. It is headquartered in Odesa and operates many radar systems including the "Pelican".

== History ==
In 1992, following the Dissolution of the Soviet union, the personnel of the 14th Radio Engineering Brigade of the Soviet Army took an oath of loyalty to Ukraine. In March 1992, the first Ukrainian commander of the brigade, Lieutenant Colonel Klimov Serhiy Borisovych, was appointed and the brigade was staffed with local Ukrainians as well as with the members of the Ukrainian diaspora. The units of the brigade that were stationed on the territory of Moldova were transferred to the Armed Forces of Moldova with the exception of one unit under the command of Lieutenant Colonel Kudar V.I. Many of its units were deployed along the border with Moldova for radar coverage and a separate radar unit of the brigade was deployed to Snake Island. It received automated radar systems and separate mobile radar platoons were established within companies and battalions of the brigade. In 2007, a separate research area for air defense "Oreanda PS" was created in the regiment. On 22 July 2008, the brigade received the honorary name of Bohdan Khmelnytskyi.

Since 2014, personnel and units of the brigade participated in the War in Donbas. Separate mobile radar platoons of the brigade were quickly redeployed and were used to create radar coverage for ATO zone. In 2016, the brigade received the newest Ukrainian-made Pelican radar systems.

On 17 August 2016, a soldier of the brigade (Oleksandr Oleksandrovich Grebenkin) was killed whilst serving on a combat mission near Andriivka. On 5 December 2016, the brigade was presented with a combat flag.

On 24 February 2022, at the start of the Russian invasion of Ukraine, the brigade's positions were struck by Russian warplanes killing eleven female soldiers of the brigade (Shoris Olga Pavlivna, Kosar Liliya Ihorivna, Tatyana Valentynivna Skurat, Nataliya Andriivna Protsyshina, Barbul Victoria Viktorivna, Larisa Mykolaivna Hutsol, Lyudmila Ruslanivna Kutishevska, Nataliya Mykolayivn Shaporova, Berina Olena Vitalyivna, Straton Alla Viktorivna and Olena Mykolayivna Dobrovolska) of the brigade and eleven male personnel (Oleksiy Adolfovich Shuda, Pavlo Vasyliovych Bondarenko, Sabatyn Serhiy Serhiyov, Dmytro Sergeyevich Zaitsev, Dmytro Volodymyrovych Holodnyuk, Bondar Andrii Andriyovych, Serhiy Serhiyovych Len, Oleksandr Serhiyovych Medvedenko, Hutsol Oleg Viktorovych, Dumbrava Andrii Ivanovych and Yasko Oleksandr Oleksiiovych) of the brigade.

On 15 June 2022, the brigade was awarded the honorary award For Courage and Bravery by the President of Ukraine Volodymyr Zelenskyy.

== Equipment ==
Besides domestically produced Equipment, Ukraine also services several Radars donated or bought from NATO-States.

Type	Image	Origin	Role	Number	Note
79К6 Pelikan		Ukraine	All-round surveillance radar	?	
AN/TPQ-36		United States Netherlands	Counter-battery radar	2-20	2 delivered by the US in 2015; More delivered by the US and the Netherlands after 2022
TRML-4D		Germany	Autonomous mobile command system for air defense with an integrated search radar Used in tandem with IRIS-T SL	Up to 16	Donated by Germany after 2022
Giraffe Mk IV		Sweden Ireland	Short Range Air Defense-Radar	Up to 5	Donated by Ireland after 2022

== Commanders ==
- Lieutenant Colonel Serhii Borisovych Klimov (1992–1994)
- Colonel Afanasov Viktor Volodymyrovych.
- Colonel Yaroslavtsev Valery Mykolayovych.
- Lieutenant Colonel Kostyantyn Mykolayovych Horlo
- Colonel Hrytsaenko Serhii Anatoliyovych (2018-)

== Separate Battalions ==
The brigade has two separate Battalions in its structure:

- Radio-technical Battalion, Kherson
- Radio-technical Battalion, Podilsk

== Sources ==
- Michael Holm. "14th Radio-Technical Brigade".
