= 43rd Communications Regiment (Ukraine) =

43rd Separate Communication and Radio Technical Support Regiment
- 43-й окремий полк зв'язку і управління
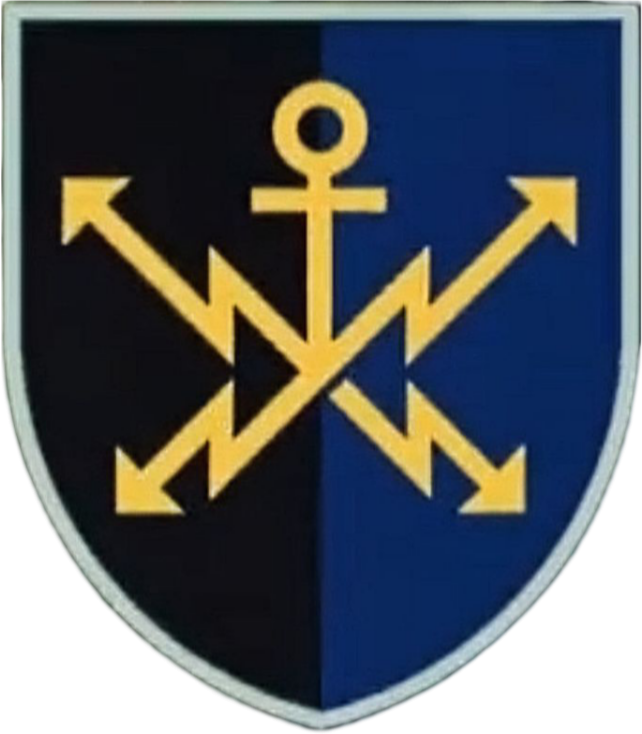
- Insignia of the Ukrainian 43rd Communications Regiment
- Active: 1992 – present
- Country: Ukraine
- Allegiance: Ukraine
- Branch: Ukrainian Air Force
- Type: Communication
- Role: Communications
- Part of: Air Command South
- Garrison/HQ: Odesa
- Engagements: Russo-Ukrainian war: War in Donbass; 2022 Russian invasion of Ukraine

Commanders
- Current commander: Colonel Valentin Shevchuk
- Notable commanders: Colonel Labunets Vadym Oleksandrovych

Insignia
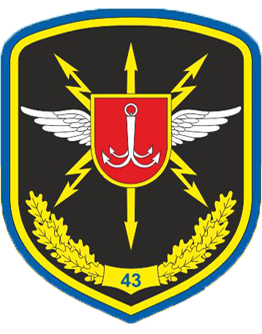
- Former Insignia

The 43rd Separate Communication and Radio Technical Support "Ivan Lutsenko" Regiment (MUN A2171) is a regiment of the Ukrainian Air Force tasked with providing command and communication facilities to the units of Air Command South. It is garrisoned in Odesa.

== History ==
In February 1992, following the Dissolution of the Soviet union, the personnel of the 43rd regiment took the oath of loyalty to the Ukrainian people in Odesa garrison. From 2007 to 2014, the regiment was repeatedly recognized as the best military unit of Odesa for its expertise shown during training exercises.

In 2014, due to the War in Donbass, the regiment was deployed in the ATO zone. In 2017, the personnel of the regiment performed the tasks of ensuring a compatible command post for aviation and air defense by the Ukrainian Air Force in the ATO zone on the territory of Donetsk Oblast and Luhansk Oblast for which it received the first position as the "best" unit of the Air Command South.

Following the Russian invasion of Ukraine, it provided communication support and its anti-aircraft fighters destroyed several Russian air targets. On 1 October 2024, it was awarded the honorary name "Ivan Lutsenko". It was also involved in a scandal where its personnel instead of performing proper duties, were used for the construction of its deputy commander's house.

== Commanders ==
- Colonel Labunets Vadym Oleksandrovych (2015–2017)
- Colonel Valentin Shevchuk (2023–present)

== Structure ==
The structure of the regiment is as follows:

- 43rd Communications Regiment
  - Management and Headquarters
  - 1st Information and Telecommunications Battalion
    - Telecommunications Center
    - Automated Management Systems Center
    - Radio Broadcasting Center
    - Radio Reception Center
    - Classified Communications Center
  - Anti-aircraft Artillery Platoon
  - Medical Center
  - Club
