= 156th Anti-aircraft Missile Regiment =

- 156-й зенітний ракетний полк
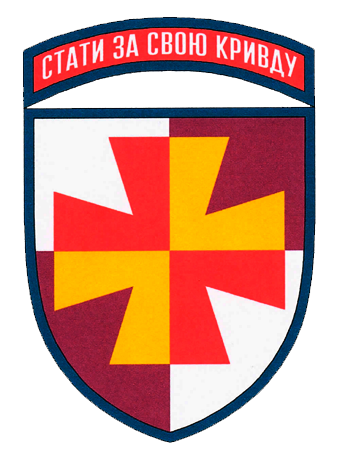
- Active: 1992 – present
- Country: Ukraine
- Allegiance: Armed Forces of Ukraine
- Branch: Ukrainian Air Force
- Type: Regiment
- Role: Anti-Aircraft
- Part of: Air Command Center
- Garrison/HQ: Zolotonosha
- Nickname: Donetsk Brigade
- Patron: Maksym Kryvonis
- Equipment: Buk M1
- Engagements: Russo-Ukrainian war: War in Donbas; Russian invasion of Ukraine
- Decorations: For Courage and Bravery

Commanders
- Current commander: Oleksandr Ivanovich Stashuk

Insignia
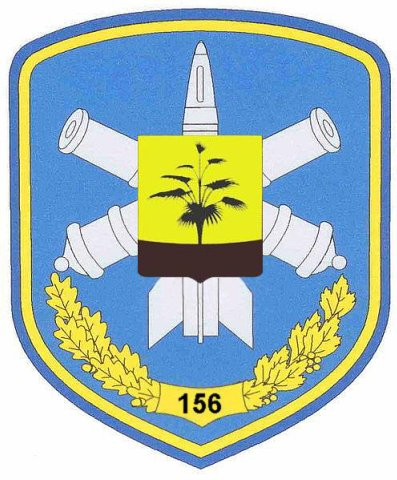
- Former Insignia

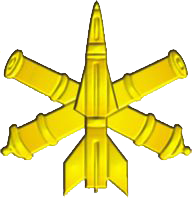
- Collar Insignia

The 156th Anti-aircraft Missile Regiment is a regiment of the Ukrainian Air Force tasked with air defense operations throughout Cherkasy Oblast. It operates Buk M1 missile systems and is subordinated to the Air Command Center. It is headquartered at Zolotonosha.

== History ==
In 1992, after the Dissolution of the Soviet union, the 156th Anti-aircraft Missile Brigade of the 14th Guards Combined Arms Army headquartered in Moldova, took the oath of loyalty to Ukraine on 12 January 1992 becoming the 156th Anti-aircraft Missile Regiment.

In 2007, the Regiment was relocated from Oleksiivka in Odesa Oblast to Donbass, one division of the regiment was stationed in Avdiivka and the other two went to Luhansk and Mariupol.

On 20 May 2008, the regiment was given the honorary name "Donetsk".

At the start of War in Donbass, the regiment was evacuated to Zolotonosha in Cherkasy Oblast where it is currently headquartered. The formerly "Avdiivka" division saw deployment at Zenit base on the southeastern outskirts of Avdiivka, east of Opytne, equipped with typical firing positions for air defense complexes, underground communications and service buildings. Starting from mid April until mid June 2014, separatists protested in front of the regiment's Zenit base, proposing to them to defect so the servicemen retaliated by air firing, crowd dispersal and barricades. The 3rd Separate Special Purpose Regiment (Ukraine) was also sent to the base to protect it. On the morning of 21 June 2014, the base was subjected to massive shelling from mortars and large-caliber machine guns destroying the radio equipment of the Regiment, followed by a separatist assault capturing the HQ of the 156th Regiment, some servicemen of the 156th regiment defected to the separatists. The 156th regiment continued fighting using ZU-23-2s and RPG-22s. From 10 July, the First Battle of Donetsk Airport started and the 156th regiment struck separatists from its positions at Zenith base destroying separatist vehicles. On 18 July, units from the 93rd Mechanized Brigade came to Zenith base with a force consisting of four tanks and a pair of BMP-2s. On 19 July, separatists surrounded the Zenith base but as the positions were heavily fortified there were no human casualties but parked vehicles of the 93rd brigade were destroyed forcing the 73rd Brigade to be withdrawn on 20 July. On July 21, fighting around the airport intensified again, so the 156th regiment provided support by destroying two separatist vehicles after which its positions were subjected to many hours of separatist fire from small arms, mortars, a tank and even BM-21 Grads killing a soldier of the regiment. After a month, the "Avdiivka" division of the 156th regiment was transferred to Zolotonosha as the Zenit position was handed over to Wild Duck Detachment. On 3 September 2014, personnel from the Dnipro-1 Regiment were ambushed and besieged near the village of Pisky on the highway between Avdiivka and Donetsk. So the 156th regiment was sent as backup providing fire support using ZU-23-2 anti-aircraft guns lifting the siege but during the engagement a soldier of the regiment (Boris Sergeyevich Kozak) was killed by sniper fire.

On 11 July 2015, a soldier of the regiment (Oleksandr Volodymyrovych Baranenko) was killed by a separatist sniper whilst serving in the ATO zone.

On.13 May 2016, a soldier of the regiment (Kostyantyn Valentynovich Grinchenko) was killed from the wounds suffered as a result of an earlier engagement with separatists.

On 25 February 2022, the second day of the Russian invasion of Ukraine, the convoy of the 156th regiment was on the way to the front lines when Russian strike helicopters attacked it destroying a battery and killing a soldier of the regiment (Bereza Serhii Hryhorovych). On 24 August 2022, the regiment was awarded the honorary award "For Courage and Bravery".

== Structure ==
The structure of the regiment is as follows:

- 1247th Separate Anti-aircraft Missile Division "Avdiivka"
- 1248th Separate Anti-aircraft Missile Division "Mariupol"
- 1249th Separate Anti-aircraft Missile Division "Luhansk"

== Commanders ==
- Oleksandr Ivanovich Stashuk (2017-)

== Sources ==
- Донецьк військовий — 7: Війська протиповітряної оборони
- Військові частини Повітряних Сил за родами військ
