= 201st Anti-aircraft Missile Brigade =

- 201-ша зенітна ракетна бригада
- Unit insignia
- Active: 1992 – present
- Country: Ukraine
- Allegiance: Ukraine
- Branch: Ukrainian Air Force
- Type: Missile
- Role: Anti-Aircraft
- Part of: Air Command South
- Garrison/HQ: Pervomaisk
- Nickname: Hetman Pylyp Orlyk Brigade
- Patron: Pylyp Orlyk
- Equipment: S-300 B1 and S-300 PS
- Engagements: Russo-Ukrainian war: War in Donbas; Russian invasion of Ukraine
- Decorations: For Courage and Bravery

Insignia
- Field Patch

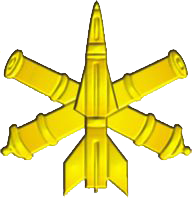
- Collar Insignia

The 201st Anti-aircraft Missile Brigade "Hetman Pylyp Orlyk" is a brigade of the Ukrainian Air Force tasked with air defense operations throughout Mykolaiv Oblast. It operates S-300B1 and S-300PS missile systems and is subordinated to the Air Command South. It is headquartered at Pervomaisk.

== History ==
In 1992, after the Dissolution of the Soviet union, the 201st brigade took an oath of loyalty to the Ukrainian people.

During the War in Donbass, the brigade was deployed in Donetsk Oblast where on 17 June 2017, a soldier of the brigade (Stovbovenko Oleh Oleksandrovych) was killed in action near Kostyantynivka. On 4 December 2019, the brigade was awarded the honorary name of Hetman "Pylyp Orlyk". At the beginning of January 2022, the S-300 PS anti-aircraft missile systems of the brigade were redeployed from ATO zone to take over the combat duty to protect the airspace of the southern Ukraine.

On 23 August 2023, the brigade was awarded the honorary award "For Courage and Bravery".

== Commanders ==
- Colonel Bobko Oleksandr Mykolayovych (2008–2017)
- Colonel Andriy Stanislavovych Mogilatenko (2017–2019)
- Colonel Valentin Mykolayovych Petrushenko (2019-)

== Structure ==
- Management and Headquarters
- 2011th Anti-aircraft Missile Division (S-300PS)
- 2012th Anti-aircraft Missile Division (S-300PS)
- 2013th Anti-aircraft Missile Division (S-300PS)
- 2014th Anti-aircraft Missile Division (S-300B1), Uman
- 2021st Anti-aircraft Missile Division (S-300PS)
- 2022nd Anti-aircraft Missile Division (S-300PS)
- 2023rd Anti-aircraft Missile Division (S-300PS)

== Sources ==
- 201-й зенітний ракетний полк
- 201-й зенітно-ракетний полк (в/ч А-2183)
- Як і навіщо РФ перетворює Крим з туристичної Мекки на військову базу
