= Air Command South =

- Повітряне командування «Південь»
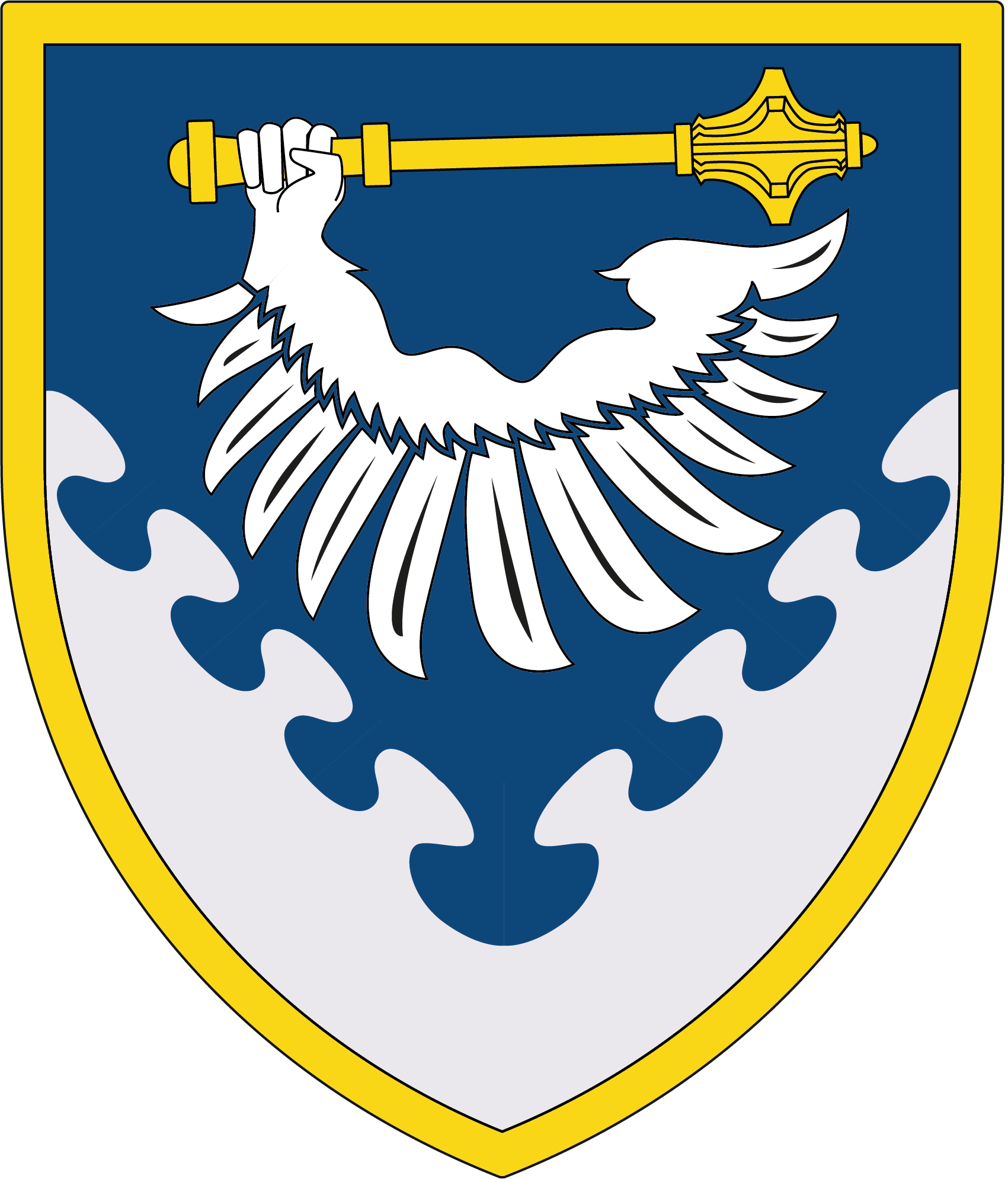
- Active: 2004-present
- Country: Ukraine
- Allegiance: Armed Forces of Ukraine
- Branch: Ukrainian Air Force
- Type: Command
- Garrison/HQ: Odesa
- Website: Official Facebook page

Commanders
- Current commander: Dmytro Karpenko

Insignia
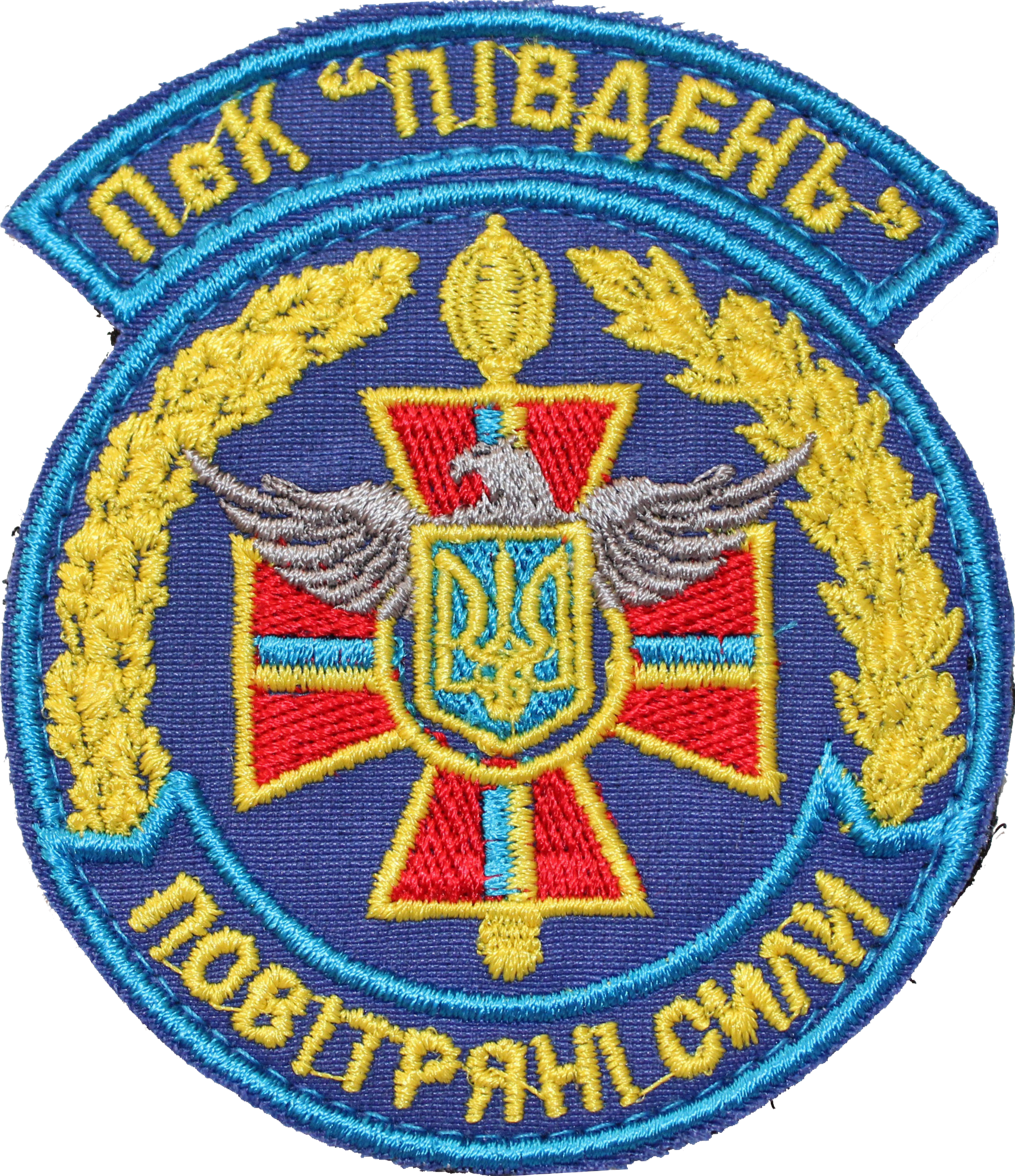
- Shoulder patch

The Air Command "South" (MUN A0800) is the military unit of the Ukrainian Air Force located in the southern part of Ukraine.

== History ==
In 2004, the Air Command South was established during the reformation of the Armed Forces of Ukraine, when the Air Force and Air Defense Forces were united into a single unit — the Air Force of the Armed Forces of Ukraine. On the funds of the 5th Aviation Corps and the 60th Air Defense Corps, the Air Command "South" was created and is headquartered in Odesa.

The regions in southern Ukraine where the Air Command South operates, are the Odesa Oblast, the Autonomous Republic of Crimea, Sevastopol, Mykolaiv Oblast, Kherson Oblast and partially the Dnipropetrovsk, Kirovhrad and Zaporizhzhia Oblasts.

It is the successor to the 5th Aviation Corps of the Air Force and the 60th Air Defense Corps since then.

The main tasks ofAir Command South are round-the-clock protection of the state border in the airspace and reliable cover from air strikes of administrative centers, large industrial and economic districts, the Southern Ukrainian NPP, the Dnipro Cascade HPP facilities, as well as important communications and military facilities in the South of Ukraine.

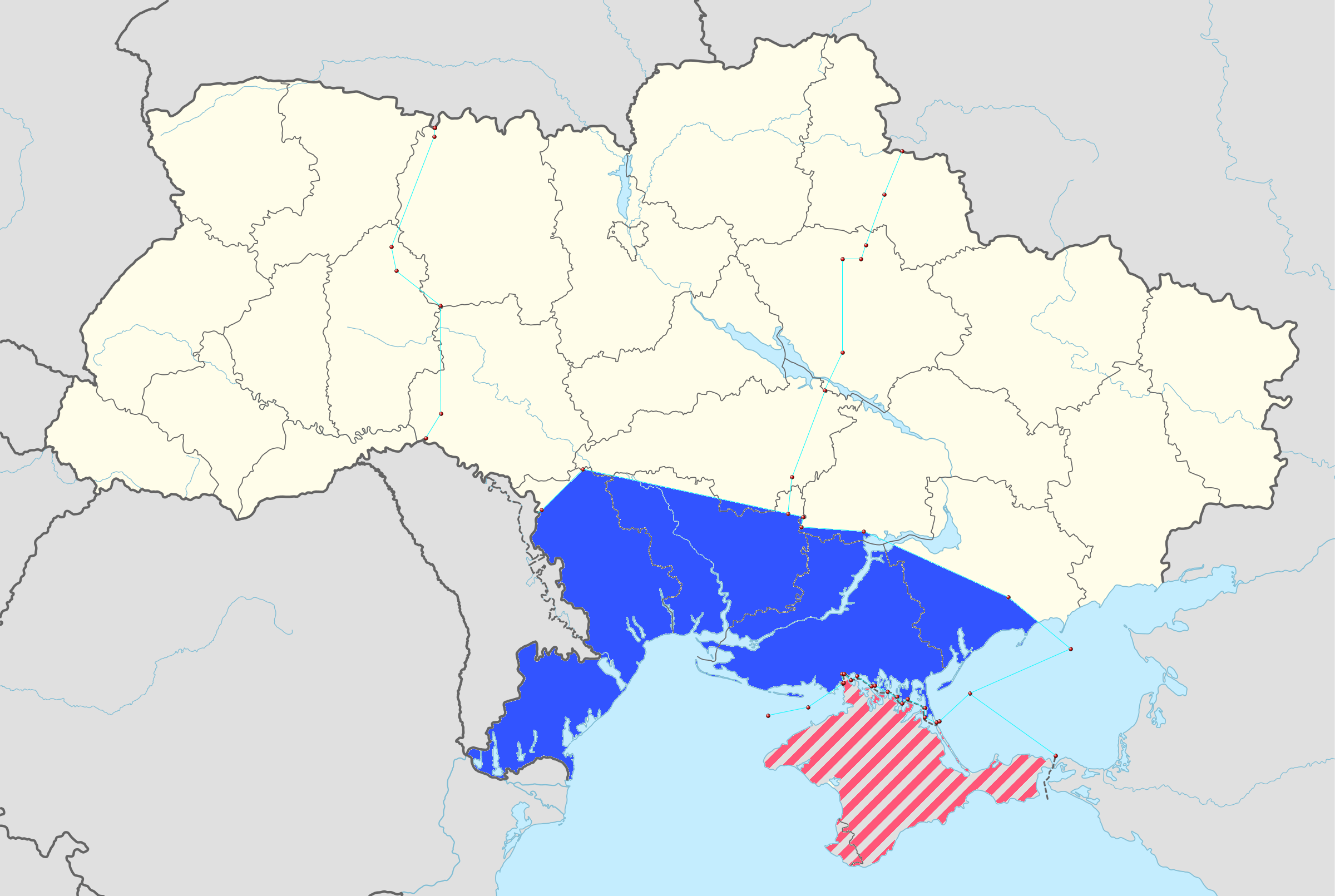
Map of the Air Command South since 23 January 2017 with occupied Crimea

== Structure ==
The composition of the Air Command "South" includes:

- management (Odesa)
  - 43rd separate regiment of communication and control (Odesa)
  - 14th Radio Engineering Brigade (Odesa)
  - 160th anti-aircraft missile brigade (Odesa; S-300PS)
  - 201st Anti-Aircraft Missile Brigade (Pervomaysk, Mykolaiv Oblast; S-300PS)
  - 208th anti-aircraft missile brigade (Kherson; S-300PS, S-300PT)
  - 195th command and control center
  - 297th Security and Service Command (Odesa)
  - 1194th separate battalion of electronic warfare (Pervomaisk, Mykolaiv Region)
  - 28th separate engineering and airfield battalion (Mykolaiv)
  - 15th Aviation Commandant's Office (Martynivske, Mykolaiv Oblast)
  - 18th Aviation Commandant's Office (Odesa)
  - 206th aviation range (Kyiv-Olexandrivske, Mykolaiv Region)

== Leadership ==
- Major General Yuriy Baydak (2004 - July 2006)
- Lieutenant General Pavlo Zuyev (October 2008 - December 2017)
- Lieutenant General Vasyl Chernenko (December 2017 - 2022)
- Major General Dmytro Karpenko (2022–present)

== See also ==
- Air Command Center
- Air Command East
- Air Command West
