= 31st Communications Regiment (Ukraine) =

31st Separate Communication and Radio Technical Support Regiment (2021-) 31st Separate Communications and Management Regiment (2004-2021) 31st Signals Brigade (?-2004) 18th Communication Node (1993-?) 133rd Communications Unit (1992—1993)
- 31-й окремий полк зв’язку та радіотехнічного забезпечення
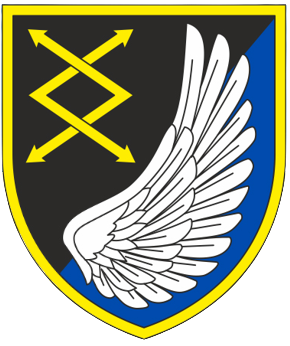
- Insignia of the Ukrainian 31st Communications Regiment
- Active: 1992 – present
- Country: Ukraine
- Allegiance: Ukraine
- Branch: Ukrainian Air Force
- Type: Communication
- Role: Communications
- Part of: Air Command Center
- Garrison/HQ: Kyiv
- Nickname(s): Hetman Mykhailo Doroshenko Regiment
- Patron: Hetman Mykhailo Doroshenko
- Engagements: Russo-Ukrainian war: War in Donbass; 2022 Russian invasion of Ukraine

Insignia
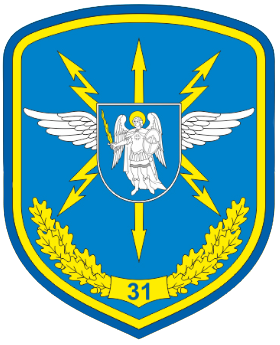
- Former Insignia

The 31st Separate Communication and Radio Technical Support Regiment "Hetman Mykhailo Doroshenko" is a regiment of the Ukrainian Air Force tasked with providing communication facilities to the units of Air Command Center. It is named after Mykhailo Doroshenko who was the hetman of Zaporozhian Cossacks. It is garrisoned in Kyiv.

== History ==
In January 1992, the 133rd Communications Unit of the 8th Separate Air Defense Army along with other units swore allegiance to Ukraine following the Dissolution of the Soviet union becoming a part of the Ukrainian Armed Forces being reorganized into the 18th Communications Unit of the Ukrainian Air Defence Forces on 1 May 1993. Later, it was reformed into the 31st Communications Brigade and in then in 2004, it was reorganized into the 31st Communications Regiment of the Air Command Center. It was the first unit of the Ukrainian Air Force that accepted Military Chaplains after the end of the Communist rule.

Since 2014, the regiment has been participating in the War in Donbass providing communication facilities to the Air Force units in the ATO zone.

On 29 October 2016, the regiment opened a football field with an artificial surface, which was built with the support of the Football Federation of Ukraine.

On 7 May 2021, the regiment celebrated its foundation day and a chapel was opened and consecrated at the regiment's headquarters.

On 23 August 2021, the regiment was awarded the honorary title "Hetman Mykhailo Doroshenko".

At the start of the Russian invasion of Ukraine, and the widespread panic during the Battle of Kyiv, volunteers joined the regiment for partaking in combat. A group of 40 Regiment's personnel headed to the Regiment's base in a "Bohdan" minibus and two more personnel in a "Renault Kangoo". About 1.5 kilometer from the headquarters, the vehicles went onto the Povitroflotsky Bridge where Ukrainian soldiers in a friendly fire incident accidentally attacked them, wounding several and forcing them to take cover, the shooting continued for an hour, following which a soldier of the regiment (Mykhailo Diaghilev) tied a Ukrainian flag to his arm and came out of the bus to stop this shootout but was killed in the process.

== Sources ==
- Mykhailo Slobodianyuk, Oleg Feshovets (2015). З'єднання і військові частини сучасних Збройних Сил України в роки Другої світової війни. Lviv: Astrolabia. pp. 195–196, 216. ISBN 978-617-664-067-7.
