= 160th Anti-Aircraft Missile Brigade =

Formation of the Ukrainian Air Force

160th Anti-Aircraft Artillery Brigade
- 160-ма зенітна ракетна бригада
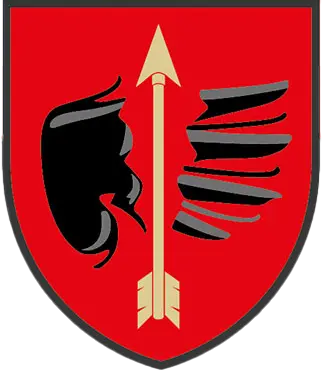
- Unit insignia
- Active: January 23, 1941 – present
- Country: Ukraine; Soviet Union (1941–1991)
- Allegiance: Armed Forces of Ukraine
- Branch: Ukrainian Air Force; Soviet Air Forces (1941–1991)
- Type: Artillery
- Role: Anti-Aircraft
- Part of: Air Command South
- Garrison/HQ: Odesa
- Decorations: Order of Suvorov Third Class For Courage and Bravery

Commanders
- Current commander: Lieutenant Colonel Mykola Oleshiuk

Insignia
- Former Insignia

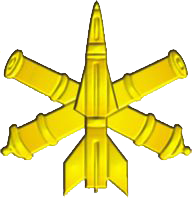
- Collar Insignia

The 160th Anti-Aircraft Artillery Brigade is a formation of the Ukrainian Air Force. The full name of the brigade is the 160th Warsaw-Odesa Order of Suvorov 3rd degree Anti-Aircraft Artillery Brigade. (Ukrainian: 160-а Варшавсько-Одеська ордена Суворова ІІІ ступеня зенітна ракетна бригада). The brigade is considered to be one of the best anti-aircraft artillery units in Ukraine.

The 160th Brigade was part of the 21st Air Defence Division (1961-1989) and then the 60th Air Defence Corps from 1989-1992, both part of the 8th Air Defence Army. From 1961-92 it was located at Odesa.

== History ==
In 1999 the brigade was given the honorable name "Odesa" for exhibiting high level of professionalism in protecting the skies over Odesa. The brigade was also awarded with its first Colour by the President of Ukraine.

== Awards ==
- 1944 received the honorable name «Warsaw»
- 1945 received the Order of Suvorov Third Class for its actions near Berlin
- 1999 received the honorable name «Odesa»

== Past commanders ==
- Lieutenant Colonel Mykola Oleshiuk
