= 208th Anti-aircraft Missile Brigade =

- 208-ма зенітна ракетна бригада
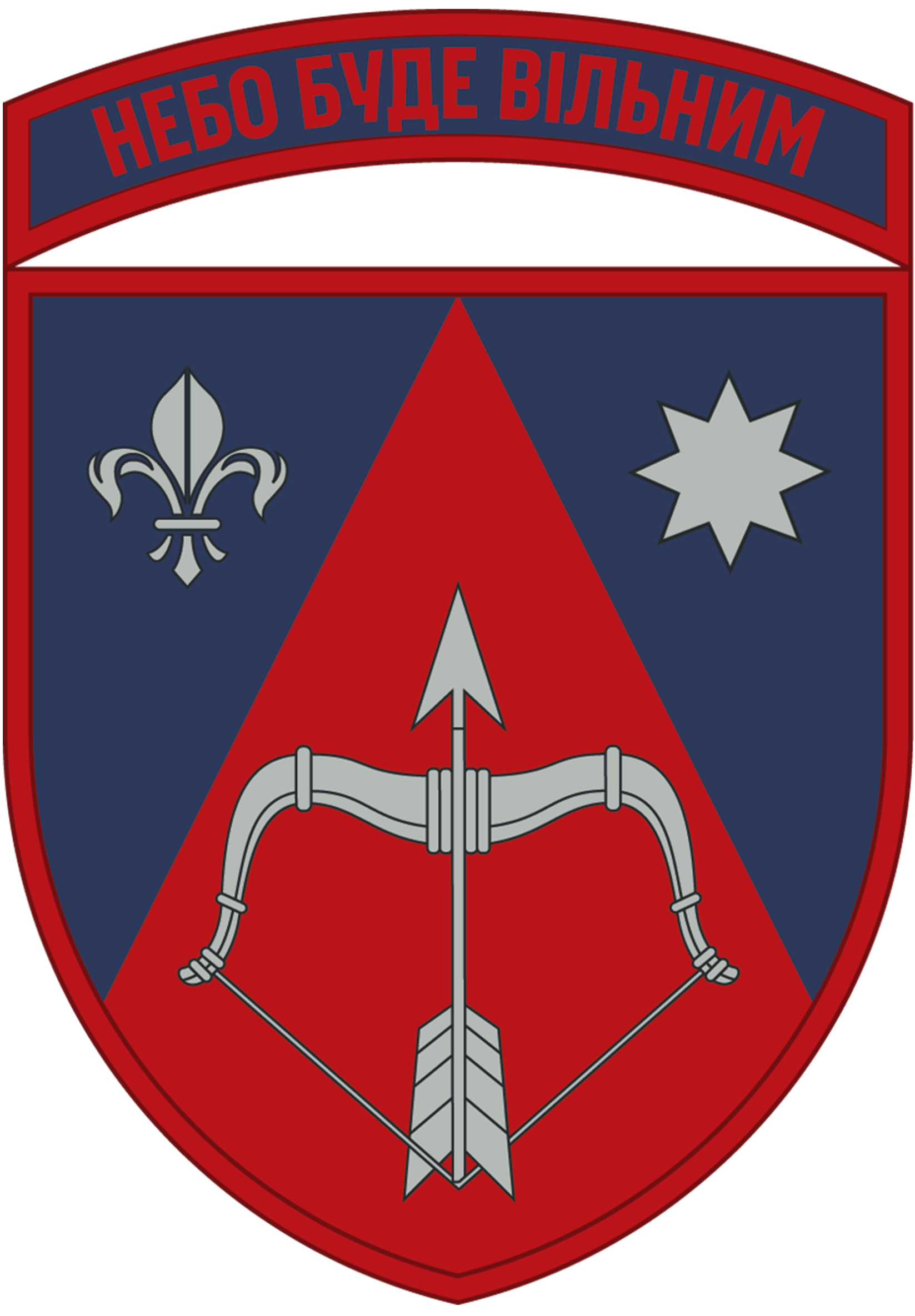
- Unit insignia
- Active: 1992 – present
- Country: Ukraine
- Allegiance: Ukraine
- Branch: Ukrainian Air Force
- Type: Missile
- Role: Anti-Aircraft
- Part of: Air Command South
- Garrison/HQ: Kherson
- Nickname: Khersonska Brigade
- Anniversaries: 9 December
- Equipment: S-300PT and S-300PS
- Engagements: Russo-Ukrainian war: War in Donbas; Russian invasion of Ukraine
- Decorations: For Courage and Bravery

Commanders
- Notable commanders: Anatoly Valeriyovych Paleny †

Insignia
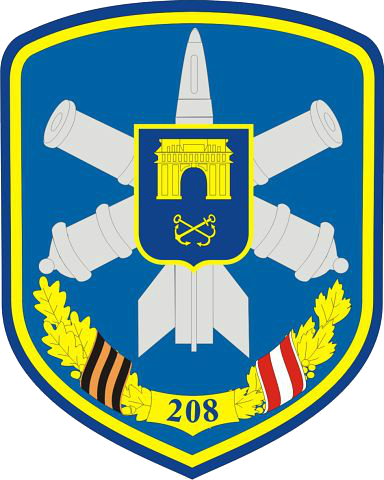
- Former Insignia

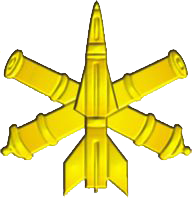
- Collar Insignia

The 208th Anti-aircraft Missile Brigade "Khersonska" is a brigade of the Ukrainian Air Force tasked with air defense operations throughout Kherson Oblast. It operates S-300 missile systems and is subordinated to the Air Command South. It is headquartered at Kherson.

== History ==
In 1992, following the Dissolution of the Soviet union, the 208th Guards Anti-Aircraft Missile Brigade of the 60th Air Defense Corps of the Soviet Army came under the jurisdiction of Ukraine and became part of the Ukrainian Armed Forces.

On 19 November 2017, near the village of Kamianka, a separatist projectile hit a dugout leading it to catch fire, one soldier of the brigade was saved but two soldiers of the brigade (Oleksandr Serhiyovych Kuzmenko and Vitaly Petrovych Pasichnyk) along with a paratrooper were killed as a result of Carbon monoxide poisoning.

From the first minutes of the Russian invasion of Ukraine, the brigade took part in the defense of Ukraine claiming the neutralization of 5 Russian fixed wing aircraft, 8 helicopters, 28 cruise missiles, and 31 UAVs of various types in 2022. On 19 October 2022, the brigade shot down a Ka-52 helicopter at around 10:30 a.m. The commander of the brigade Anatoly Valeriyovych Paleny was also killed in action on 28 October 2022 whilst serving in Mykolaiv. On 24 October 2022, from 13:00 to 13:30, the brigade shot down one of the two Russian Ka-52 helicopters. On 27 October 2022 at around 8:00 a.m. the brigade shot down a Russian Ka-52 helicopter.

On 23 August 2023, the 208th brigade was awarded the honorary award "For Courage and Bravery" by Volodymyr Zelenskyy.

On 2 August 2024, the brigade was awarded the honorary name of "Khersonska".

== Commanders ==
- Anatoly Valeriyovych Paleny † (?-2022)

== Sources ==
- 208-я зенитная ракетная бригада (в/ч 53848)
- Військові частини Повітряних Сил за родами військ
- "Бійців військової частини Нової Каховки привітали з днем Збройних Сил України". radionk.com.ua/. Radio Nova Kakhovka. 2017-12-07. Archived from the original on 2018-03-12.
