= Karpivka =

Karpivka (Ukrainian: Карпівка) may refer to the following places in Ukraine:

- Karpivka, Chernihiv Oblast, village in Chernihiv Raion, Chernihiv Oblast
- Karpivka, Crimea, village in Krasnohvardiiske Raion, Crimea
- Karpivka, Dnipropetrovsk Oblast, village in Kryvyi Rih Raion, Dnipropetrovsk Oblast
- Karpivka, Lyman urban hromada, Kramatorsk Raion, Donetsk Oblast, village in Lyman urban hromada, Kramatorsk Raion, Donetsk Oblast
- Karpivka, Mykolaivka settlement hromada, Kramatorsk Raion, Donetsk Oblast, village in Mykolaivka settlement hromada, Kramatorsk Raion, Donetsk Oblast
- Karpivka, Oleksandrivka settlement hromada, Kramatorsk Raion, Donetsk Oblast, village in Oleksandrivka settlement hromada, Kramatorsk Raion, Donetsk Oblast
- Karpivka, Odesa Oblast, village in Rozdilna Raion, Odesa Oblast
- Karpivka, Poltava Oblast, village in Kremenchuk Raion, Poltava Oblast
- Karpivka, Vinnytsia Oblast, village in Mohyliv-Podilskyi Raion, Vinnytsia Oblast
