= Air Command Center =

- Повітряне командування «Центр»
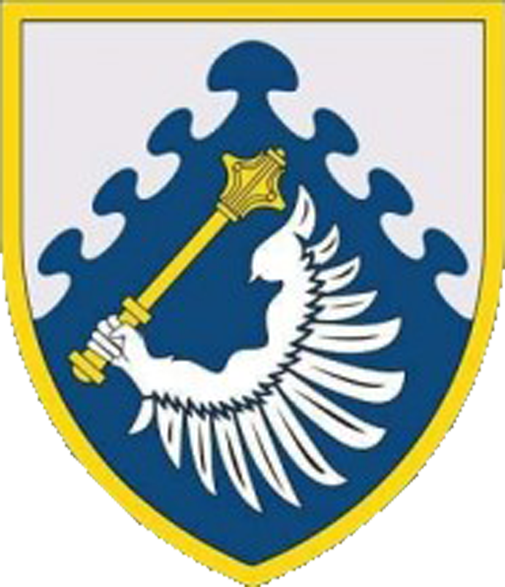
- Active: 2005-present
- Country: Ukraine
- Allegiance: Armed Forces of Ukraine
- Branch: Ukrainian Air Force
- Type: Command
- Garrison/HQ: Vasylkiv, Kyiv Oblast
- Website: Official Facebook page

Commanders
- Current commander: Serhiy Yalyshev

Insignia
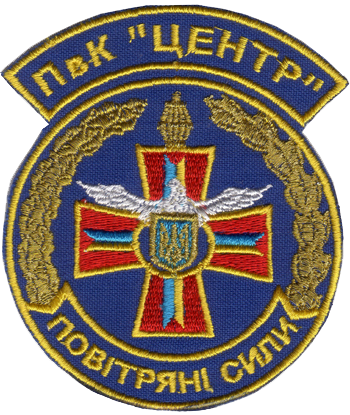
- Shoulder patch

The Air Command "Center" (MUN A0820) is the military unit of the Ukrainian Air Force located in the central part of Ukraine, cantered around Kyiv.

== History ==
The regions in central Ukraine where the Air Command Center operates, are the Kyiv, Kyiv Oblast, Vinnytsia Oblast, Zhytomyr Oblast, Cherkasy Oblast, and Chernihiv Oblast, and partially Poltava, Sumy, Kirovohrad regions. The command had held it in the central and eastern regions, until January 2017.

The main tasks of PvC "Center" are round-the-clock protection of the state border in the airspace and reliable cover from air strikes of large industrial and economic districts, administrative centers, the capital of the country - the city of Kyiv, the objects of the Dnipro Cascade HPP, the Chernobyl NPP, as well as important communications and military facilities in Northern, North-Eastern and Central Ukraine.

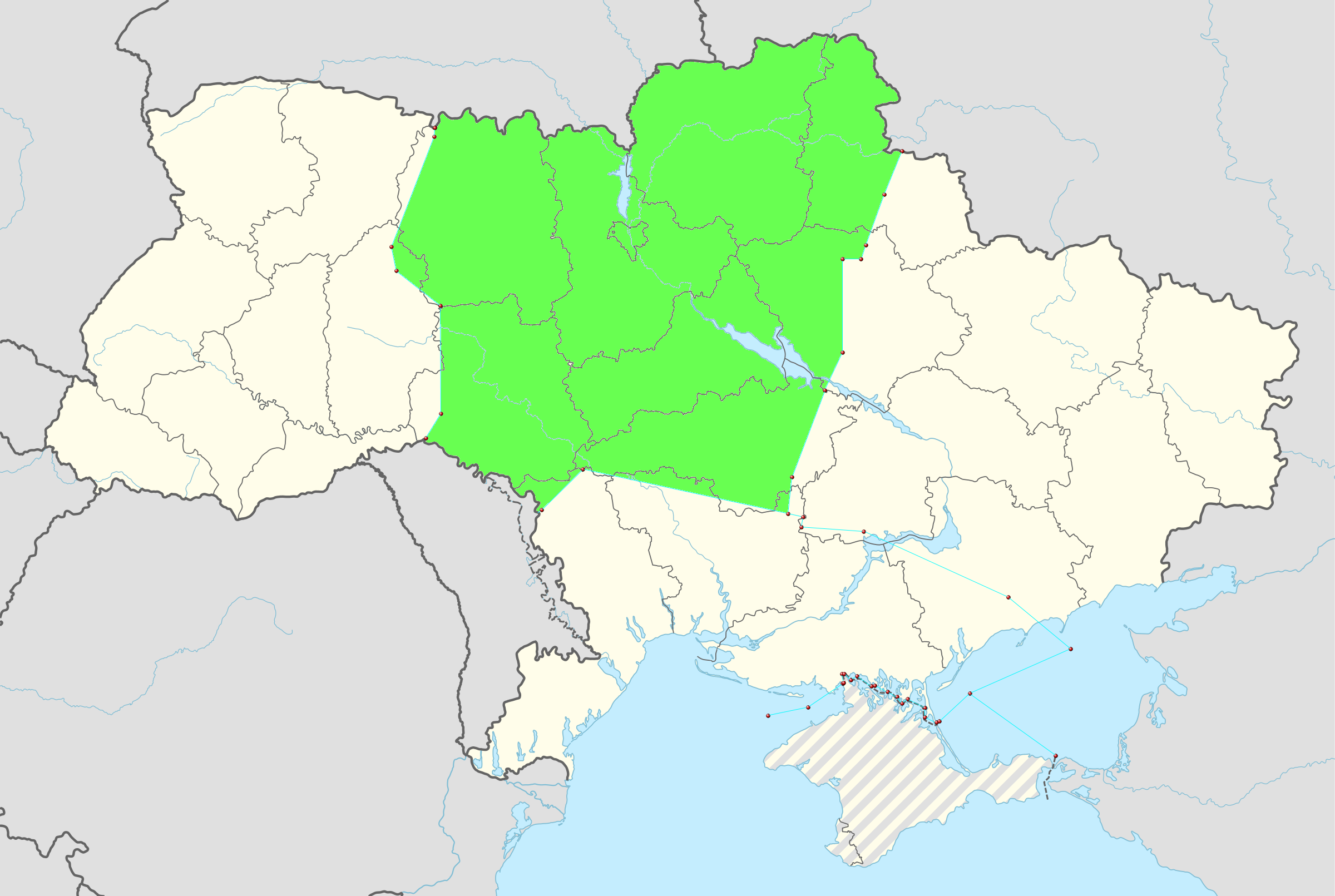
Map of the Air Command Center, formally formed since 23 January 2017

== Structure ==
The composition of the Air Command Center includes:

management (Vasylkiv, Kyiv region)

- 31st Separate Command and Radio Technical Support Regiment (Kyiv)
- 138th radio engineering brigade (Vasylkiv)
- 39th Tactical Aviation Brigade (Ozerne, Zhytomyr Region; Su-27)
- 40th Tactical Aviation Brigade (Vasylkiv; MiG-29, MiG-29MU1, L-39)
- 831st Tactical Aviation Brigade (Myrhorod, Poltava Region; Su-27, L-39)
- 14th Anti-aircraft Missile Regiment (Poltava Oblast; MIM Hawk)
- 96th Anti-Aircraft Missile Brigade (Danylivka, Kyiv region; S-300PS, S-300PT)
- 156th anti-aircraft missile regiment (Zolotonosha, Cherkasy region; 9K37 "Buk-M1")
- 192nd command and control center
- 77th Security and Service Command (Vasylkiv)
- 2204th separate battalion of electronic warfare (Vasylkiv)
- 21st Aviation Commandant's Office (Kropivnytskyi)
- 110th Aviation Commandant's Office (Uman, Cherkasy Region)
- 112th Aviation Commandant's Office (Ozerne)
- 215th Aviation Commandant's Office (Pyryatyn, Poltava Region)

== Leadership ==
=== Commanders ===
- Major General Arkadiy Vashustin (until 8 August 2015)
- Lieutenant General Anatolii Kryvonozhko (8 August 2015 – 30 August 2024)

== See also ==
- Air Command East
- Air Command South
- Air Command West
