= Vasyl Chernenko =

Ukrainian army officer

- Василь Іванович Черненко
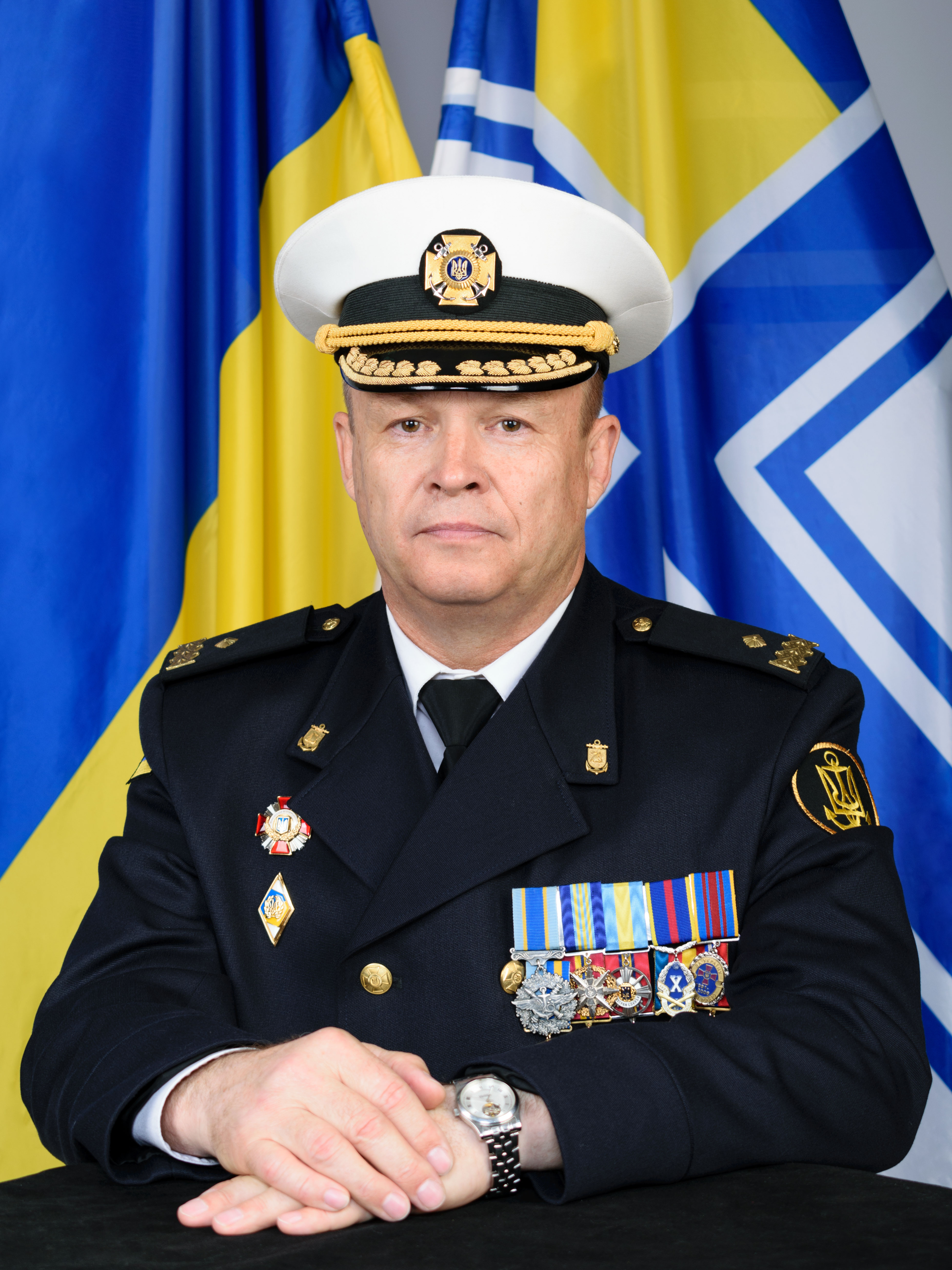
- Official portrait, 2017
- Born: Vasyl Ivanovych Chernenko; 1 January 1959 (age 67); Zvenyhorodka, Ukraine, Soviet Union
- Military career
- Allegiance: Ukraine
- Branch: Ukrainian Air Force
- Service years: 1987-
- Commands: Air Command South

Vasyl Ivanovych Chernenko (Ukrainian: Василь Іванович Черненко; born on 1 January 1959), is a Ukrainian army officer who last served as the Commander of Air Command South from 2017 to 2022.

He is a first class pilot.

== Biography ==
Vasyl Chernenko was born in Zvenigorodka in Cherkasy Oblast on 1 January 1959.

From 1978 to 1982, he studied at the Chernihiv Higher Military Aviation School of Pilots.

In 1982, he was a pilot, and in 1983, he was promoted to a senior pilot of the fighter aviation regiment. From 1984 to 1987 (with a short break) he was the commander of the link of the Fighter Aviation Regiment. In 1987 he was the Deputy Commander, and since 1988, had been promoted to squadron commander.

From 1989 to 1992, he studied at the Military Team Academy of GK Zhukov, after which he headed the Aviation Squad of the Fighter Aviation Regiment until 1998. In the same year, he was the Commander of the Aviation Squad of the Fighter Aviation Brigade, and in 2000, he was demoted to the deputy commander of the brigade. From November 2001 to December 2003, he was Commander of the Fighter Aviation Regiment. From December 2003 to December 2004, he again became the deputy commander of the aviation fighter brigade.

In December 2004, Chernenko headed the 204th Fighter Aviation Brigade of the Air Force of the Armed Forces of Ukraine, which in 2007 was recognized as one of the best formations of the Armed Forces of Ukraine. As a military pilot, he was awarded 1st class. As of 2007, he had a total flight time of 1,476 hours on a MiG-29.

In March 2009, Chernenko has been appointed as the Deputy Commander of the Ukrainian Navy for Aviation - Head of the Aviation and Air Defense Department of the Ukrainian Navy Command (military unit A0456). Under his leadership, the management structure was significantly improved, work continued on increasing the number of combat-ready aviation equipment and combat-ready flight crews of the brigade, and the work of the "NYTKA" scientific and training complex was organized.

On 23 August 2014, by Decree of the President of Ukraine No. 679/2014, Chernenko was promoted to Major General.

On 23 December 2017, Chernenko was appointed commander of the Air Command South.

On 3 May 2019, Chernenko has been promoted to Lieutenant General by Petro Poroshenko.

He was dismissed as commander of the Air Command South in 2022.

== Family ==
He is married to his wife Lyudmila Anatolyivna, who was serving under a contract in military unit A-2255. The couple has two sons, Anatoliy and Vladyslav.
