= Ukrainian Air Force =

Aerial warfare of Ukraine

- Повітряні сили Збройних сил України
- Emblem of the Ukrainian Air Force
- Active: 1917–1921; 1992–present
- Country: Ukraine
- Type: Air force
- Role: Aerial warfare
- Size: 35,000 (2022); 207 aircraft (2021)
- Part of: Armed Forces of Ukraine
- Headquarters: Vinnytsia
- Anniversaries: Air Force Day (the first Sunday of August)
- Engagements: Soviet–Ukrainian War; Polish–Ukrainian War; Russo-Ukrainian War; War in Donbas; Russian invasion of Ukraine

Commanders
- Commander: Lieutenant General Anatolii Kryvonozhko
- Chief Master Sergeant of the Air Force: Chief Master Sergeant Kostiantyn Stanislavchuk

Insignia
- Roundel

- Fin flash

- Flag

Aircraft flown
- Attack: Su-24M, Su-25
- Fighter: MiG-29, Su-27, F-16, Mirage 2000
- Helicopter: Mi-8T, Mi-17
- Reconnaissance: An-30, Su-24MR, Bayraktar TB2, RQ-11
- Trainer: Aero L-39
- Transport: An-24, An-26B, An-30, An-70

The Ukrainian Air Force (Ukrainian: Повітряні сили Збройних сил України, romanized: Povitryani syly Zbroynykh syl Ukrayiny, lit. 'Air Forces of the Armed Forces [of] Ukraine', PS ZSU) is the air force of Ukraine and one of the eight branches of the Armed Forces of Ukraine (ZSU). Its current form was created in 2004 by merging the Ukrainian Air Defence Forces into the Air Force.

When the Soviet Union dissolved in 1991, many aircraft were left in Ukrainian territory as the Soviet Air Force disbanded. After Ukrainian independence in 1991, the air force suffered from chronic under-investment, leading to the bulk of its inventory becoming mothballed or otherwise inoperable. However its domestic defense industry Ukroboronprom and its Antonov subsidiary are able to maintain its older aircraft.

The Ukrainian Air Force participated in the war in Donbas. Following the 2014 ceasefire, the air force was suspended from carrying out missions in the areas of Donbas. Since February 2022, the Air Force has been engaged in constant combat operations in the face of the Russian invasion of Ukraine. The Air Force primarily flies Soviet-made aircraft, with an estimated 45 Mikoyan MiG-29 and 23 Sukhoi Su-27 multirole combat aircraft. Since the invasion, Ukraine now operates 39 General Dynamics F-16s, and 6 Mirage 2000s, with the former supported by the F-16 training coalition. In the long term, Ukraine aims to procure Gripen and Rafale combat aircraft, supported by Saab 340 AEW&C. In air defense, the Air Force operates approximately 178 S-300 missile system units, and eight MIM-104 Patriot units.

== Missions ==
The role of the Air Force is to protect the air space of Ukraine. The objectives are: obtaining operational air superiority, delivering air strikes against enemy units and facilities, covering troops against enemy air strikes, providing air support to the Ukrainian Ground Forces, Marine Corps and the Navy in wartime operations and peacetime exercises, disrupting enemy military movements on the ground, air and sea, disrupting enemy communications, and providing air support by reconnaissance, airdrops, and troop and cargo transportation in both peace and war, in support of the Armed Forces, other uniformed forces, and wider mandates of the Government of Ukraine.

In peace-time, this is carried out by flying air-space control missions over the entire territory of Ukraine (603,700 square km), and by preventing air space intrusion along the aerial borders (totaling almost 7,000 km, including 5,600 km of land and 1,400 km of sea).

As of 2025, combatting enemy jets which drop glide bombs is important.

== History ==
=== 1917–1945 ===
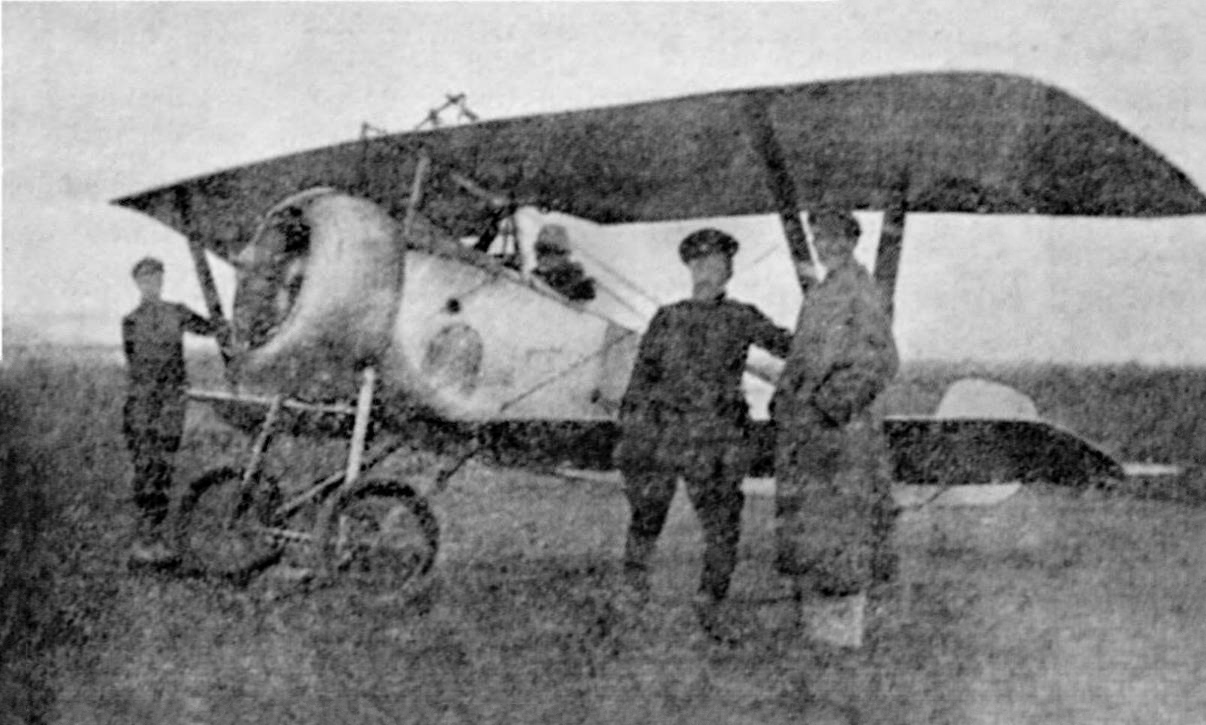
A Nieuport 17 of the Ukrainian Galician Army

Ukrainian military aviation started with the winter 1917 creation of the Ukrainian People's Republic Air Fleet, headed by former commander of the Kyiv Military District Lieutenant Colonel Viktor Pavlenko. Previously, while in Russian service in World War I, Pavlenko was in charge of air security of the Russian Stavka.

Sometime in 1918, the West Ukrainian People's Republic created its own aviation corps with the Ukrainian Galician Army headed by Petro Franko, a son of renowned Ukrainian writer Ivan Franko. In 1918, he organized an aviation school of the Ukrainian Galician Army Command Center which was active until 1920.

The airplanes used by Ukraine in this period included Belgium-built SPAD S.VIIs. The Ukrainian Galician Army used Nieuport 17 biplanes. At the beginning of 1918, 188 aircraft of 26 models were listed in Ukrainian registers.

During World War II, Ukrainian pilots took part in combat operations as part of the Soviet Air Force. Among these pilots, Ivan Kozhedub is notable for being the highest-scoring Allied ace with over 60 credited solo victories.

=== Collapse of the USSR ===
==== Air Forces ====
On the basis of the ex-Soviet Air Forces formations in Ukraine, the Ukrainian Air Force, as a service branch of the young Armed Forces, was established on 17 March 1992, in accordance with a Directive of the Chief of the General Staff of the AFU. The headquarters of the 24th Air Army of the Soviet Air Force in Vinnytsia served as the basis to create the Air Force headquarters. The newly created PSZSU nominally controlled at least three Frontal Aviation Armies (5th, 14th, and 17th), the Strategic 46th Air Army, the 8th Air Defence Army including the 28th, 49th, and 60th Air Defence Corps from the Soviet Air Defence Forces (PVO), two Military Transport divisions, at least nine Army Aviation regiments, and a large part of the Naval Aviation of the Black Sea Fleet, for a total of 49 regiments and 11 independent squadrons with more than 2,800 aircraft and helicopters. The PSZSU also controlled the 106th Heavy Bomber Division, based at Pryluky. This division included twenty-seven Tu-95MS bombers, two obsolete Tu-95M, nineteen new Tu-160 bombers, and twenty Il-78 aerial tankers. The 160th Division also had at least 564 Kh-22 and Kh-55 air-to-surface nuclear cruise missiles in their inventory.

After combining all its flying assets into the Air Force (though ground-based elements of the PVO remained separate as the Ukrainian Air Defence Forces until 2004), Ukraine gradually began downsizing the size of the PSZSU in order to comply with the Treaty on Conventional Armed Forces in Europe (CFE) terms. Faced with difficulties maintaining a strategic bomber fleet, Ukraine was forced to scrap part of their bomber fleet under the Nunn-Lugar Cooperative Threat Reduction program and return some aircraft and all nuclear cruise missiles to Russia in exchange for settling debts for oil and natural gas imported from the Russian Federation.

==== Air Defence Forces ====
In 1992, the newly independent Ukrainian State took over control over the three Air Defence corps stationed in Ukraine and retained the Air Defence Forces of Ukraine as a separate armed service, equal in status to the Ground Forces, Air Forces and the Navy. The 28th Corps was transferred to the now-Ukrainian 8th Separate Army of Air Defence.

=== 1991–2014 ===
Since its independence in 1991, Ukraine launched a three-stage reform program to reform its Armed Forces. During the first stage which ran from 1991 to 2006, the ZSU shrank in size and capabilities. Corruption, already endemic in the political and economic system of the country began spreading into the ZSU, resulting in an increase of draft dodging cases and bases falling into a state of decay. Under the government of Viktor Yanukovych from 2010 to 2014, an armed conflict with Russian Federation was considered unthinkable, resulting in further budget cuts. By 2014, the Air Force was suffering from chronic under-investment, leading to the bulk of its inventory becoming mothballed or otherwise becoming inoperable.

In 1993, the International Institute for Strategic Studies (IISS) estimated that the PSZSU had 171,000 personnel with 900 combat capable aircraft plus 440 in storage; 87 reconnaissance, 47 electronic countermeasure, 274 transport, 560 training fixed-wing aircraft, and 142 helicopters.

Between 1994 and 2003, the entire fleet of 60 Tu-22M2 and Tu-22M3 with the exception of a few aircraft preserved for display in local museums, were scrapped alongside 423 Kh-22 cruise missiles. By 1995−96, the MiG-23, MiG-25, and Su-15 interceptors were withdrawn from service. While Ukraine was less than keen on returning its fleet of strategic bombers to Russia "since they could be used in roles other than nuclear attack", the PSZSU was soon unable to keep the fleet operational with Russia refusing to sell spare parts, forcing the Ukrainian government to start negotiating the possible sale of the aircraft back to Russia, but as talks dragged on, their condition seriously deteriorated. Starting in November 1998, some of the older aircraft began to be scrapped with American funding (with a few examples preserved as local museum exhibitions) and in October 1999, Ukraine finally agreed to return eight Tu-160s, three Tu-95MS's (out of nineteen Tu-160s and twenty-three Tu-95MS), and 575 Kh-55MS nuclear cruise missiles to settle debts for oil and natural gas imported from the Russian Federation.

During the second stage of reforming the ZSU, which ran from 2006 to 2014, Ukraine was supposed to (at least on paper) move from the old Soviet model of fielding large formations into a smaller, fully trained and equipped professional force, taking advantage of new technologies such as digitalization, precision-guided munitions and sensors, and command and control infrastructure. However, by 2014, it became clear that such plans were beyond the capabilities of the Ukrainian state to fund and implement, resulting in the PSZSU (and other branches of the Armed Forces) being unprepared for the War in Donbas. Between 2006 and 2017, Ukraine sold as many as 65 combat jets (Su-27s, Su-25s, Su-22s, MiG-29s, and MiG-21s), 41 L-39s trainers, six An-72, An-74, and An-12 military transports, three Il-78 tankers, 50 Tu-143 reconnaissance drones, 44 Mi-24 attack helicopters and 802 missiles of various types (R-24, R-27, R-73 air-to-air missiles and Kh-59 air-to-surface cruise missiles).

On average, the Ukrainian radar forces detect and track more than 1,000 targets daily. As a result, in 2006 two illegal crossings of the state border were prevented and 28 violations of Ukrainian air space were prevented. Due to such increased strengthening of air space control, the number of air space violations decreased by 35% compared to the previous year, even though the amount of air traffic increased by 30%.

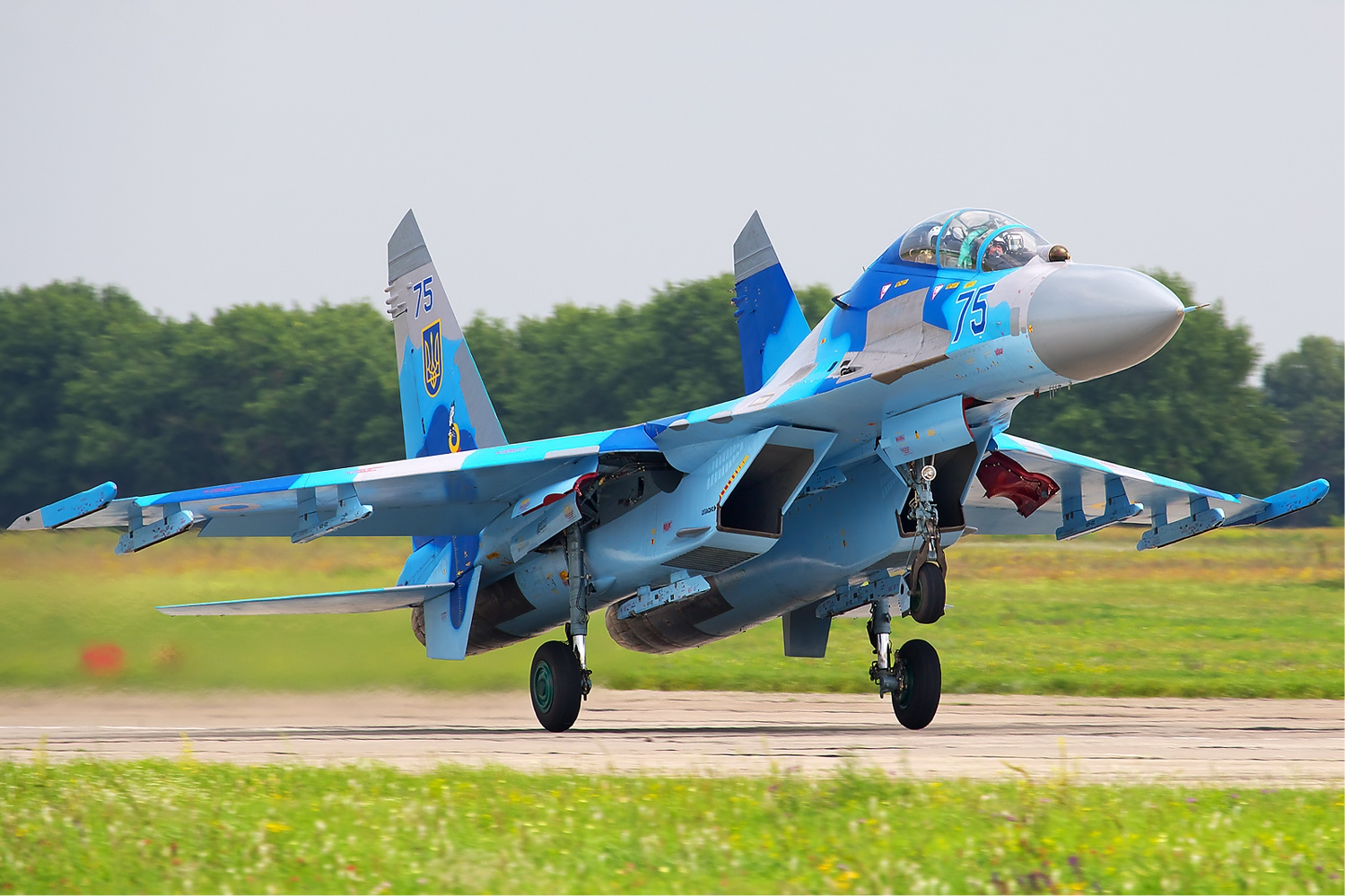
A Ukrainian Sukhoi Su-27 in July 2011

By 2010, the Air Force was reduced to 45,240 personnel (down from 96,000 in 2002). Formations included seven brigades with 188 combat aircraft; two reconnaissance squadrons operated thirty-three Su-24MRs; three transport brigades with 31 aircraft (An-24, An-26, Tupolev Tu-134, and Il-76); a helicopter fleet with 38 Mi-9s, Mi-8s, and Mi-2s. While only thirty-nine L-39s were available for training compared to 300 operational in 2002.

Some upgrade programs were carried to overhaul and upgrade the PSZSU fleet of fighters and fighter-bombers. In 2008, 12 Su-25s were upgraded to the Su-25M1K standard. In 2011, the Air Force received its first four upgraded MiG-29MU1s with assistance from Rockwell Collins. From 2012 onwards, the MiGremont company started working on upgrading Su-27 to the Su-27M1 standard. However, due to the lack of funds, only part of the fleet was upgraded prior to February 2014.

=== Role in the 2014 Russian invasion of Ukraine ===
In 2014, the PSZSU was reduced to 144 aircraft, but only two-thirds were operational at the time. Due to the poor condition of several of their aircraft, some units were severely understrength (for example, the 7th Tactical Aviation Brigade had only 10 operational Su-24M and MRs in February that year).

Despite its poor condition, the Air Force operated intensively in the Donbas region, inflicting heavy casualties on the pro-Russian insurgents, albeit at a heavy cost. During the first four months of the War in Donbas alone, the Ukrainian Air Force and Ukrainian Army Aviation lost four Mi-24 gunships, two Mi-8 helicopters, six Su-25s, three transport aircraft and four strike and air-superiority fighters. In total, 20 aircraft were shot down or lost in accidents, 126 were captured by the Russians after their air bases in Crimea were seized; while 51 servicemen of the PSZSU were killed including 16 pilots from February to early September 2014. Ukraine later managed to secure the return of 92 of the captured aircraft.

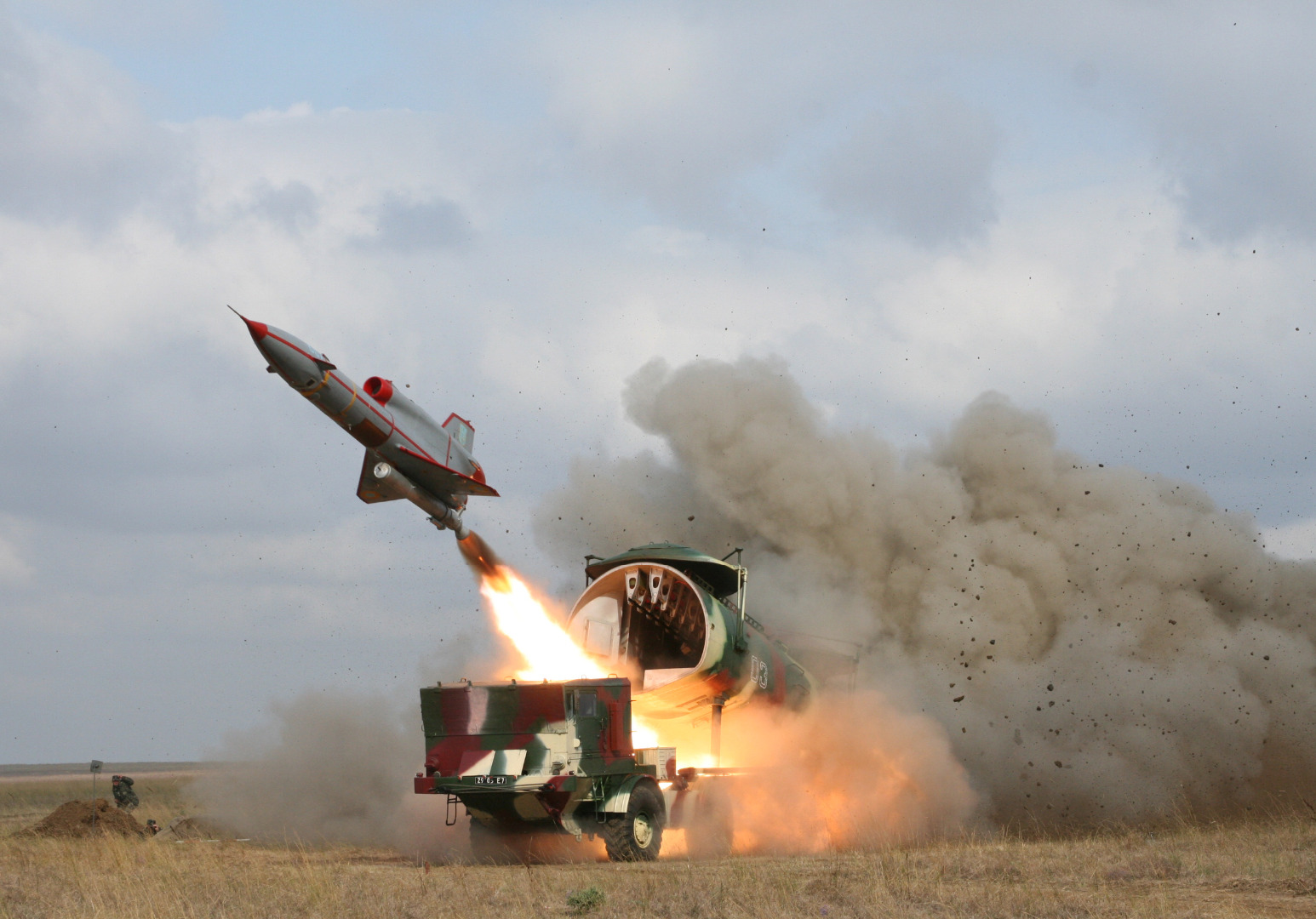
A Ukrainian Tu-143

While the Russians made ample use of drones since the start of the conflict for observation and fire control, Ukraine had very few drones in early 2014. In fact, the Air Force operated none at all. In August 2014, the PSZSU began employing restored Tu-141 and Tu-143 reconnaissance drones, while citizens and supporters from abroad (specially the Ukrainian diaspora in Canada) launched crowdfunded initiatives to buy or build reconnaissance drones for the ZSU.

After the ZSU was defeated in the Battle of Ilovaisk, Russia demanded a complete ban on the Ukrainian use of air power as a condition for the Minsk I peace agreement, though Air Command East based at Dnipropetrovsk kept two units of S-300PS surface-to-air missile batteries on standby against potential Russian airstrikes.

=== Developments towards restoration (2014−2021) ===
Starting in 1993, the United States National Guard worked with the Ukrainian Air Force as part of a NATO sponsored program. The Ukrainian Air Force worked with the California Air National Guard's 144th Fighter Wing and pilots exercised together, including in 2011 and 2018.

In response to the Russian annexation of Crimea and the insurgency in the Donbas region, Ukraine attempted to obtain a license to produce the Saab JAS 39 Gripen locally as well purchase Embraer EMB 314 Super Tucano training aircraft, but due budgetary constraints, talks were cancelled in August 2014. Immediately after, Kyiv issued order No. 499 allocating funds to restore and upgrade as many Soviet-era fixed-wing aircraft and helicopters as possible. Such effort was possible thanks to clandestine purchases of spare parts abroad. Also Ukraine, a former hub of the Soviet aerospace industry, inherited hundreds of factories including: Konotop Aircraft Repair Plant (AVIAKON), Lviv State Aviation Repair Plant (LSARP or LDARZ), Nikolaev (Mykolaiv) Aircraft Repair Plant (NARP), Zaporizhzhia State Aircraft Repair Plant (ZDARZ, also known as "MiGremont"), Odessa Aircraft Plant (ODARZ, aka "Odessaviaremservis"), and the Lutsk Repair Plant Motor. Additionally, the Air Force also received enough funding to reactivate former air bases at Kanatove, Voznesensk, Velykyi Buialyk, and Artsyz.

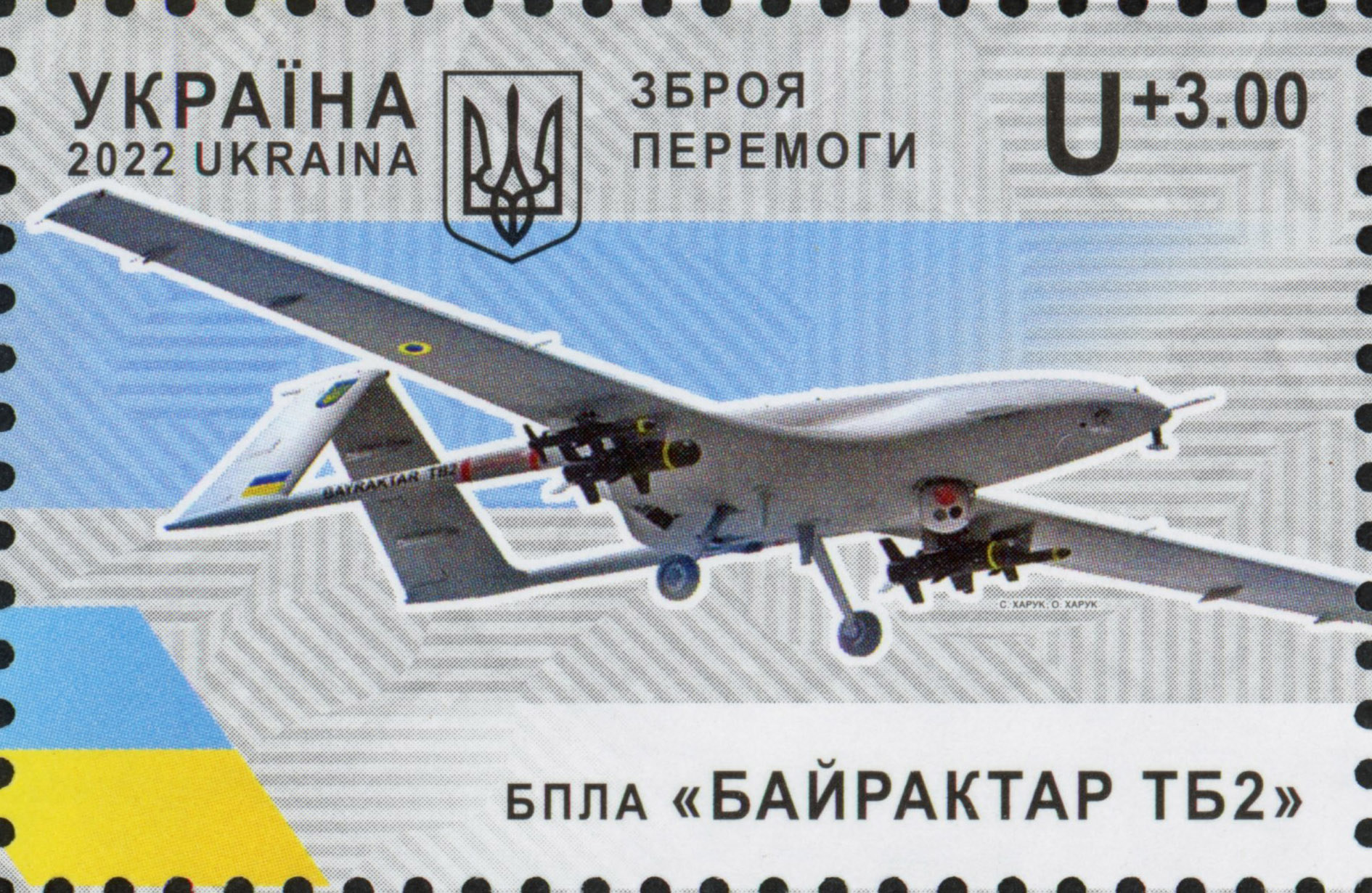
A 2022 Ukrainian postage stamp depicting a Bayraktar TB2 drone

Since 2014, the PSZSU also worked on restoring several SAM systems kept in storage, including the S-300V. In August 2014 the Air Force received enough funding to reactivate 68 Soviet vintage Tu-141 and Tu-143 reconnaissance drones. While in 2019, Kyiv received its first batch of six Bayraktar TB2 drones from Turkey. By 2022, 36 were operational with the Air Force and Navy.

In 2019, spending on the PSZSU reached ₴8.3 billion (US$320 million), allowing the gradual resumption of regular practice flights, though according to Cooper, the leftover Soviet flight regulations and bureaucratic red tape prevented pilots from effectively putting into practice new tactics learned from NATO pilots during joint exercises.

In 2020, the Kyiv Post reported that Ukraine planned on fully replacing its fleet of Soviet combat jets with 72−108 Western multirole combat aircraft (such as the Gripen E/F or F-16 Block 70/72); fully replace its Ilyushin and Antonov transport and L-39 Albatros trainer aircraft with unspecified types; and creating a force of attack and reconnaissance unmanned aerial vehicles by 2035. Kyiv also planned on fully replacing its Soviet SAM systems with modern systems including the NASAMS, SAMP-T and MIM-104 Patriot in the next 15 years. The total cost of this project was estimated as ₴320 billion (US$12 billion) over a period of 15 years (over 38 times the budget of PSZSU in 2019).

Prior to February 2022, the Air Force was equipped with a fleet of partially upgraded old aircraft (with the newest airframes being 30 years old) and inferior weaponry in comparison to their Russian counterparts; while its personnel were plagued by low salaries, poor living conditions, and insufficient annual flying hours per pilot, barely enough to maintain proficiency. Another problem for the PSZSU was a shortage of qualified pilots, with only 10−15 cadets graduating from the Ivan Kozhedub National University of the Air Force in Kharkiv every year, while hundreds of pilots abandoned service or retired between 2020 and 2021.

=== Role in the Russian invasion of Ukraine ===
On the morning of 24 February 2022, most of the Ukrainian air defense crews were on their bases, while a handful were on training duties when the Russians launched a barrage of at least 160 ballistic and cruise missiles (Kh-101, Kh-555, 3M54 Kalibr, and 9K720 Iskander) and anti-radiation missiles (Kh-31, Kh-58) as well, hitting at least 83 ground targets including 11 air bases, 19 air defense radar systems and 39 "other" radar stations while up to 22 S-300 launchers and 17 launchers for other SAM systems knocked down during the first 48 hours of the Russian "special military operation". With communications from the headquarters in Vinnytsia cut off by a Russian cyberattack a day earlier, local commanders were forced to act independently in face of the enemy onslaught, with pilots quickly taking off and scattering to avoid incoming missiles, ground crews being hastily evacuated as well as starting repairs of remaining equipment.

On 24 February 2022, the PSZSU had 116 operational combat aircraft (MiG-29s, Su-27s, Su-25s, and Su-24Ms) according to Business Insider. In March 2022, Ukraine still had about 55 operational combat aircraft according to David Deptula, senior scholar at the United States Air Force Academy.

In April 2022, the Pentagon stated that Ukraine not only managed to maintain its fleet of fixed-wing aircraft, but also repair damaged aircraft after receiving spare parts and equipment through the United States' coordination and provision, with a senior US defence official claiming that about 20 aircraft were restored to operational status. On 19 September, US Air Force General James B. Hecker said that Ukrainian air defences had shot down 55 Russian warplanes since the start of the invasion. He credited this success to the Ukrainian use of Buk and S-300 air defence systems. As the US doesn't have these systems getting new missiles from European allies was a "big ask" from Kyiv. Russian airplanes increased their operations due to the 2022 Ukrainian Kharkiv Oblast counteroffensive. The tally went to 55 after the British Ministry of Defence stated that it believed that some 4 Russian jets had been downed by Ukraine over the previous 10 days. This was due to a number of factors including changing front lines, or the fact that they were under pressure to provide closer ground support. Hecker further claimed that the Ukrainian Air Force was at about 80% of its pre-invasion strength after 7 months of combat.

In May 2023 the BBC interviewed several Ukrainian Air Force pilots. Even with MiG-29s supplied from Slovakia and Poland these are still old, with the same Soviet era equipment and radars as their own Ukrainian aircraft. When long range radar guided missiles, such as the R-37M, are fired by Russian aircraft Ukrainian pilots have to rely on ground radar to warn them verbally. Once a launch is detected pilots must abandon their mission and fly extremely low. Another pilot said that his radar cannot see cruise missiles, so they can't be shot down. Most of the pilots fly extremely low during attack missions. When they are in action they use Soviet era unguided bombs and rockets. Due to these limitations one pilot estimates that "they [Ukrainian pilots] carry out up to 20 times fewer sorties than the Russian Air Force."

As of 4 August 2023, according to Forbes the Ukrainian Air Force lost seven aircraft, "four MiG-29s, an Su-24, an Su-25 and an Su-27". The reduced rate of loss, compared to a reported 62 aircraft in 2022, is credited to longer range western weapons.

According to leaked US intelligence documents from February and March 2023, Ukraine stocks of missiles for their Soviet SAM systems are running low due to the constant barrage of Russian missiles and drones aimed at critical infrastructure and civilian targets, forcing commanders to choose which targets can be shot down or not. To address this issue, the US and their allies began providing Ukraine with a large range of air defense systems, from truck-mounted guns to Patriot batteries.

In May 2023, a Patriot of the PSZSU in the Kharkiv Oblast reportedly shot down a Russian Su-34 fighter-bomber, a Su-35 fighter, and three Mi-8 helicopters in the Bryansk Oblast. In December Ukrainian Patriots or S-300s were used to shoot down three Su-34s in a single engagement in the occupied Southern Ukraine. A month later Ukrainian SAMs shot down a Beriev A-50 early warning aircraft flying over the Sea of Azov. According to a US Army officer, a German-supplied Patriot was used to ambush the A-50. On 23 February 2024, a second A-50 was shot down by a S-200 SAM in Krasnodar Krai. On 19 April 2024, a Russian Tu-22M3 bomber was shot down in Stavropol Krai with a S-200 missile according to the chief of the Main Directorate of Intelligence, Lt. Gen. Kyrylo Budanov.

Some American officers told The New York Times that Ukraine used a Patriot missile to shoot down a Russian Il-76 transport in the Belgorod Oblast on 24 January 2024, allegedly killing everyone on board. According to Ukrainian claims the plane was carrying S-300 missiles, while Russia claimed it was carrying 65 Ukrainian prisoners of war. Sources told the NYT that at least some of the passengers were POWs. According to Forbes, some of the Ukrainian prisoner names that were listed as passengers were already exchanged.

After receiving its first F-16s in August 2024, they were initially used in a defensive role, shooting down Russian cruise missiles, with the General Staff of the Ukrainian Armed Forces stating that: "In the course of air combat, F-16 aircraft demonstrated their high effectiveness, [and] with [their on-board] weapons shot down four enemy cruise missiles". On 29 August 2024, an ex-Danish F-16 piloted by Lt. Col. Oleksii Mes crashed, killing him. In 2025, the PSZSU F-16s are used in both offensive and defensive operations, intercepting incoming drones and missiles while also launching missiles and bombs at Russian positions along the front lines.

On 7 January 2025, the Ukrainian Air Force Command claimed that an unnamed F-16 pilot managed to shoot down six cruise missiles with air-to-air missiles and cannon fire during a Russian missile strike on the morning of 13 December 2024.

On 16 January 2025, the PSZSU launched an investigation on whether key personnel are being redeployed to reinforce the Eastern Front, following allegations that MiG-29 maintenance crews were sent as infantry affecting the combat readiness of the fleet. According to reports from The Kyiv Independent and Militarnyi, thousands of Air Force personnel including aviation, anti-aircraft, and radio engineering crews, were transferred to the Ground Forces since 2024 following a January 11 directive from Commander-in-Chief Oleksandr Syrskyi ordering the transfer of 5,000 personnel from the Air Force to the Ground Forces, while the General Staff of the Armed forces of Ukraine denied such allegations.

=== Re-equipping developments (2022−present) ===
As of August 2023, according to Forbes, Ukraine lost 69 aircraft since February 2022, but they have been receiving equipment and funding from other countries, including 27 MiG-29G and MiG-29AS fighter jets donated from Poland and Slovakia, while the Air Force has been able to restore some grounded Su-27s back to service. In January of that year, the PSZSU began preparing infrastructure to allow the operation of Western fighter jets such as the F-16, improving the quality of operating areas and possibly lengthening runways. In April 2023, photographic evidence showed that the PSZSU managed to restore at least one Su-25 donated by North Macedonia to flyworthy condition and upgrade to the Su-25M1(K) standard before it joined the 299th Tactical Aviation Brigade. In February 2024, the 7th Tactical Aviation Brigade commander Col. Yevhen Bulatsyk told the Voice of America that the brigade not only managed to make up for its losses of Su-24M/MR bombers, but expand its numbers by restoring as many grounded aircraft as possible.

Ukraine has also received Western air-defense systems from allies, including the Patriot, IRIS-T, NASAMS, MIM-23 Hawk, and gun trucks to help protect its skies from missiles, fighter jets and drones. In 2023, the Pentagon launched its "FrankenSAM" project which builds SAM systems capable of firing AIM-9M missiles built from parts obtained from the US, allies, and partners for Ukraine. Meanwhile, the Soviet Buk was modified by American engineers to fire RIM-7 missiles. Also as part of the FrankenSAM project, the US also restored and revamped retired Hawk systems. Other FrankenSAMs include 9K33 Osas modified to fire R-73 missiles and Patriot missile launchers combined with elements from existing Ukrainian air defenses, which might include radars for the S-300P. On May 28 2026 Sweden agreed to sell Ukraine 20 Saab Gripen E with first delivery in 2030. The agreement also included 16 older fighters of Gripen C that would be delivered in early 2027.

In April 2024, a Ukrainian defense official told The War Zone that Ukraine received help from partners to provide an improved guidance system for their S-200 batteries, which were retired from service in 2013, before being reactivated during the war. "The missile itself has a good maneuvering system, so if provided with proper guidance is quite a modern weapon," the official stated. According to TWZ it is possible that Ukraine may have developed mobile launchers to allow its S-200 missiles to be fired from different locations. In January 2025, Syrsky stated in an interview with TSN that Ukraine is developing its own air defense systems in response to the Russian Oreshnik ballistic missile.

In July 2023, it was reported that Ukraine Su-24 bombers were adapted to fire Storm Shadow missiles by using parts taken from Panavia Tornados retired from British service. On 24 April 2024, during the Center for Strategic and International Studies (CSIS) annual Global Security Forum, Under Secretary of Defense for Acquisition and Sustainment Dr. William LaPlante confirmed the use of iPads or similar commercial tablets by Ukrainian pilots to quickly integrate modern Western weaponry (such as AGM-88 HARM missiles, JDAM-ER and AASM Hammer glide bombs) on their Soviet-era jets. On 9 June 2024, Serhiy Golubtsov, the head of aviation within Ukraine's Air Force Command told in an interview with Radio Free Europe/Radio Liberty that after Ukraine exhausted its stockpiles of unguided munitions inherited from the Soviet Union and US-supplied Zuni rockets, their Su-25 attack aircraft began using French-supplied Hammer glide bombs. Golubtsov also stated that Ukraine is working on the development of domestically produced glide bombs.

Western allies started preparing the transfer of surplus aircraft for Ukraine including nearly 100 F-16s, some Mirage 2000-5 and a pair of Saab 340 airborne early warning (AEW) aircraft.

On 26 September 2025, the Air Force announced the establishment of a sub-branch dedicated to unmanned air defense interceptors of drones, in addition to increasing the number of light helicopters with mounted machine guns for drone interceptions as well as enhancing electronic warfare for drone interception near Ukrainian cities.

On 17 November 2025, Ukraine signed a deal to procure up to 100 Rafale jets over a 10 year period.

== Equipment ==
The last reliable information of the number of Ukrainian Air Force operational aircraft came in December 2021; during the current escalation of fighting, losses, technical refitting and donations may have changed the equipment numbers reported below.

=== Aircraft ===
As of December 2023, the amount of aircraft that are still in service, especially fighter aircraft, is uncertain. Ukraine had 43 MiG-29s, 12 Su-24s, 17 Su-25s, and 26 Su-27s in active service in 2021 according to data from Flight Global in 2021.

==== Current inventory ====
Aircraft	Origin	Type	Variant	In service	Notes
Combat aircraft
General Dynamics F-16	United States	Multirole	A/AM	39	About 85 to be delivered.
Mikoyan MiG-29	Soviet Union	Multirole	S/M1/M2/UB/G/AS	45	9 are used for conversion training.
Sukhoi Su-24	Soviet Union	Attack	M/MR	13	Modified to fire Storm Shadow missiles.
Sukhoi Su-25	Soviet Union	Attack / Close air support	M1/M1K/UB/UBM1/UBM1K	17	4 are used for conversion training.
Sukhoi Su-27	Soviet Union	Multirole	S1M/P1M/UB1M/UP1M	23	6 are used for conversion training.
Dassault Mirage 2000	France	Multirole	5F	6	4 to 14 more to be delivered.
Reconnaissance
Antonov An-30	Soviet Union	Surveillance	B	3	
SAAB 340	Sweden	AEW&C	ASC 890		2 to be delivered.
Transport
Antonov An-24	Soviet Union	Transport	B/T/RT	22	
Antonov An-26	Soviet Union	Transport		22	
Antonov An-70	Ukraine	Transport		1	
Helicopters
Mil Mi-8	Soviet Union	Transport / Utility	TB/MSB-V	15	
Mil Mi-9	Soviet Union	Command post		2+	
Mil Mi-17	Soviet Union Russian Federation	Transport / Utility	E/M/V-5	7	Donated by several countries since 2022
Trainer aircraft
Aero L-39	Czechoslovakia	Jet trainer	C/M1	42	
Direct Fly Alto	Czech Republic	Trainer	NG	10	
Unmanned aerial vehicle
Bayraktar TB2	Turkey	Unmanned combat aerial vehicle		?	At least 8 were donated by Baykar.

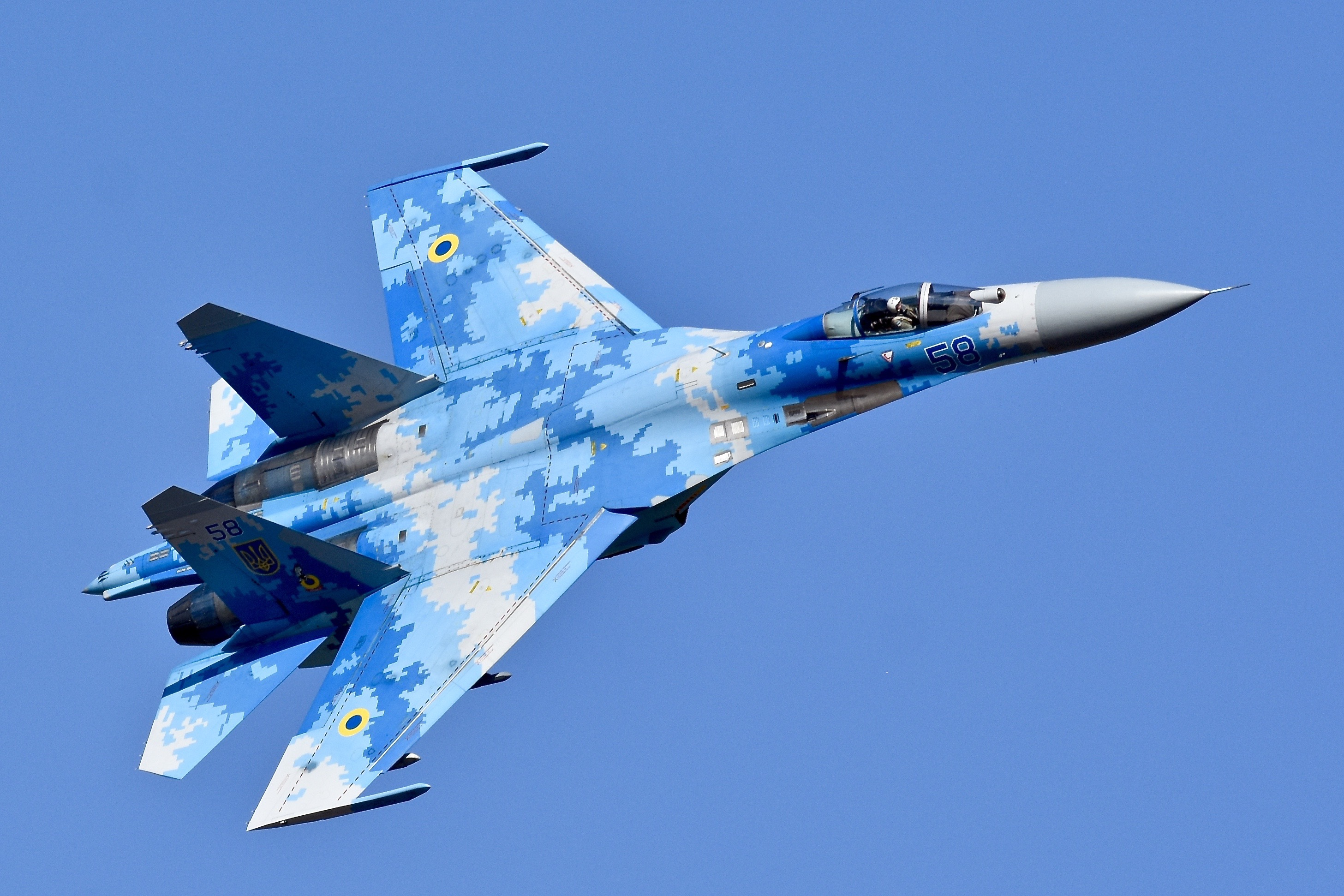
Su-27 over Royal International Air Tattoo (2018)

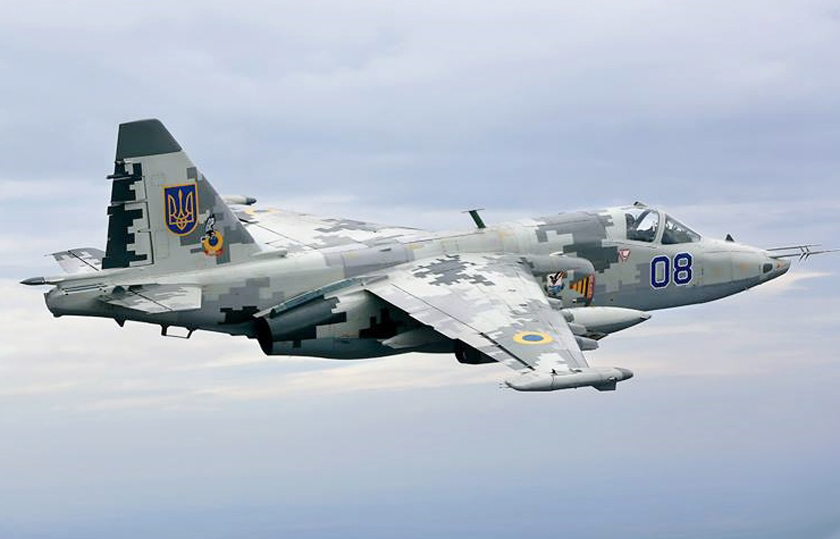
Ukrainian Su-25

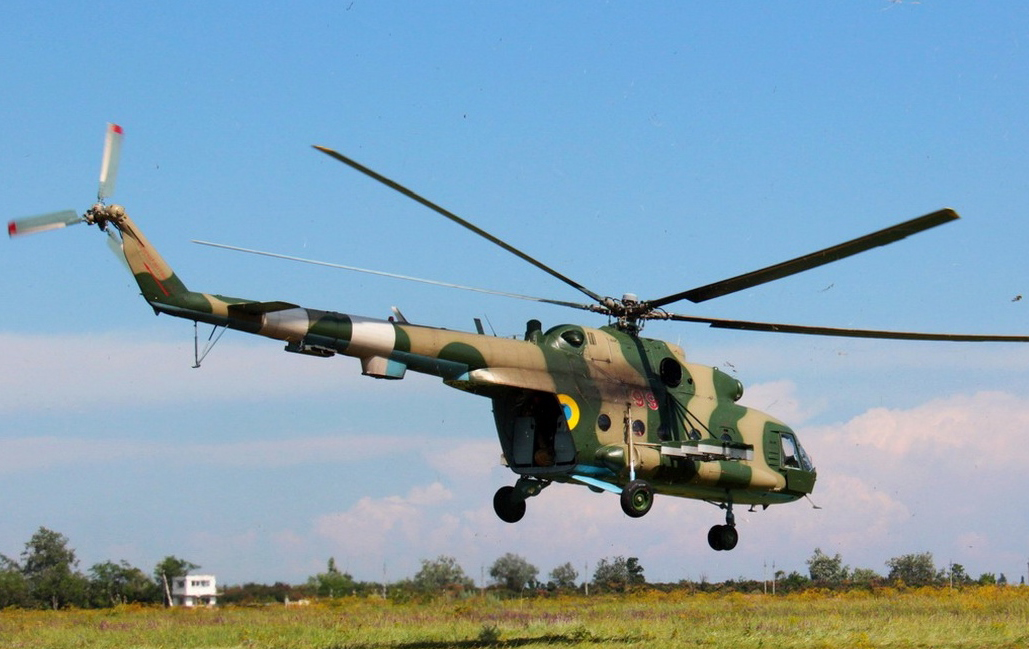
An Mi-8 helicopter lifts off from the military training academy in Odesa

==== F-16 procurement ====
In May 2023, the United States indicated support for training Ukrainian pilots on the F-16 fighters and for allies to transfer the aircraft to Ukraine. Jets announced to be donated will be delivered to Ukraine once the Ukrainian pilots have completed their training.

Denmark will provide 19 F-16 aircraft and the Netherlands will attempt to provide up to 100% of their remaining fleet of 42 aircraft, with the exception of the aircraft required for the training of Ukrainian pilots and maintenance personnel that will take place in Denmark and Romania. Denmark aims to deliver six F-16s by April 2024, then eight F-16s in the rest of the year and five afterwards. The Netherlands committed to an initial delivery of 18 aircraft.

Norway have provided two F-16s to train Ukrainian pilots, while the total number of aircraft provided to Ukraine will be six. Belgium announced that they will send a total of 30 F-16s to Ukraine by 2028, with Ukrainian president Volodymyr Zelenskyy stating that the first aircraft will be delivered by the end of 2024. In a compliance report in accordance with the Arms Trade Treaty, Norway stated it had delivered 14 F-16s to Ukraine in 2024.

All F-16 aircraft supplied by Denmark, the Netherlands, Norway, and Belgium will be the F-16AM (single-seat) / F-16BM (twin-seat) Block 15 Mid-Life Update (MLU) variants. These variants are analogous to the F-16C/D Block 30/50/52.

As of August 2024, Ukraine has received ten F-16s, and six Ukrainian pilots have completed their training. By the end of 2024, Ukraine is expected to have twenty F-16s. The remaining jets will be delivered in batches throughout 2025.

==== Mirage 2000-5 procurement ====
On 6 June 2024, according to Le Figaro, French president Emmanuel Macron announced the future transfer of an unspecified number of Mirage 2000-5 fighter jets to Ukraine.

According to French Defense Minister Sébastien Lecornu, the first Mirages will be delivered in the first quarter of 2025, and they will be modernized before delivery, with new air and ground combat systems as well defenses against electronic warfare. In October 2024, it was reported that the first batch of three Mirages will be equipped with MICA missile, SCALP-EG cruise missiles, and AASM Hammer guided bombs. In November 2024, French legislator Frank Giletti stated in his budget review that six Mirage 2000-5Fs will be delivered to the UAF with a "complete support model" for maintenance and combat readiness.

In December 2024, Ukrainian pilots and ground crews completed their training in France. Reportedly Ukraine asked for a total of 12 Mirage 2000-5Fs to fulfill the immediate needs of the Air Force. On 6 February, Ukraine received an undisclosed number of Mirages, and ex-Dutch F-16s as well.

==== Gripen procurement ====
While Ukraine attempted to obtain Saab JAS 39 Gripens as early as 2014, as of November 2024 there was no indication on the transfer of the aircraft (at least on the short term), with Ukraine's NATO allies prioritizing ongoing deliveries and support of F-16s to the PSZSU; though Sweden has earmarked spare parts (enough for 14 aircraft) for a future delivery according to Swedish Minister of Defence Pål Jonson. On 6 February 2025, Commander-in-Chief of the ZSU Oleksandr Syrskyi confirmed that negotiations on the transfer of Gripens C/D to Ukraine are still ongoing. On 22 October 2025, Sweden and Ukraine signed a letter of intent for the supply of 100 to 150 Gripen to Ukraine. In May 2026, Sweden and Ukraine announced that Ukraine would buy 20 new Gripen fighter jets and that Sweden would donate 16 additional Gripen jets of an older model to Ukraine.

==== Rafale procurement ====
On 17 November 2025, Ukraine signed a deal to procure up to 100 Rafale jets over a 10 year period.

=== Retired ===
Previous aircraft operated include: An-12, Il-76, Il-78, L-29, Mi-2, Mi-6, MiG-21, MiG-23, MiG-25, MiG-27, Su-15, Su-17, Tu-16, Tu-22, Tu-22M, Tu-95MS, Tupolev Tu-134, Tu-141, Tu-143, Tu-160, and Yak-28

=== Armament ===
Name	Origin	Type	Variant	Notes
Air-launched cruise missiles
Storm Shadow / SCALP-EG	France; United Kingdom	Long-range cruise missile		
Air-to-air missiles
R-73	Soviet Union	Short-range		
R-60	Soviet Union	Short-range	R-60M	
R-27	Soviet Union/Ukraine	Medium-range	ER/ET	
AIM-9 Sidewinder	United States	Short-range	L/M/X	
AIM-120 AMRAAM	United States	Medium-range	B/C	
AIM-7 Sparrow	United States	Medium-range		Used in the surface-to-air role.
RIM-7 Sea Sparrow	United States	Short-range		Used in the surface-to-air role.
ASRAAM	United Kingdom	Short-range	AIM-132	Used in the surface-to-air role.
Air-to-surface missile
Kh-25	Soviet Union		MP	
Kh-29	Soviet Union			
Kh-58	Soviet Union	Anti-radiation missile		
AGM-88 HARM	United States	Anti-radiation missile		
Decoy missiles
ADM-160 MALD	United States		B	
Guided bombs
KAB-1500L	Soviet Union	Laser guided		
KAB-500KR	Soviet Union	TV guided		
MAM-L	Turkey			For Baykar Bayraktar TB2.
MAM-C	Turkey			For Baykar Bayraktar TB2.
Joint Direct Attack Munition	United States		ER	
GBU-39 Small Diameter Bomb	United States		B	
Armement Air-Sol Modulaire	France			
Paveway	United Kingdom		Paveway IV	To be supplied by the UK.
Unnamed guided aerial bomb	Ukraine			Similar in concept to the French AASM.
Unguided bombs
OFAB-100-120	Soviet Union			
OFAB 250–270	Soviet Union			High explosive fragmentation.
FAB-250	Soviet Union			
FAB-500	Soviet Union		OFAB-500ShN; OFAB-500ShR	Parachute retarded fragmentation bomb.
Unguided rockets
S-8	Soviet Union		S-8KOM	
S-13	Soviet Union			
S-24	Soviet Union		S-24B	
S-25	Soviet Union		S-25OF	
Hydra 70	United States			Used on Su-25 bombers and Mi-8 helicopters.
Illumination bombs
SAB-250-200	Soviet Union			

=== Air defense ===
Name	Origin	Type	In service	Pledged	Notes
Surface-to-air missile
S-300PS; S-300PT S-300V S-300PMU	Soviet Union	Mobile long-range SAM	170 ? 8		One S-300PMU battery was donated by Slovakia in 2022.
S-200	Soviet Union	Static long-range SAM	?		Reactivated in 2024.
9K37 Buk M1	Soviet Union	Mobile medium-range SAM	50		Modified to fire AIM-7 Sparrow/RIM-7 Sea Sparrow missiles.
S-125 Neva/Pechora	Soviet Union	Mobile short-range SAM			Modernized to the S-125-2D standard. The Polish S-125 Newa-SC is also used.
IRIS-T SLM	Germany	Mobile medium-range SAM		6	
IRIS-T SLS	Germany	Mobile short-range SAM		7	
NASAMS	Norway/United States	Mobile short- to medium-range SAM	14		
MIM-104 Patriot	United States	Mobile long-range anti-ballistic missile system	8		PAC-3 variant used.
SAMP/T	Italy/France	Mobile long-range ABM	1	1	
Aspide	Italy	Mobile medium-range SAM	4+		
MIM-23 Hawk	United States	Mobile medium-range SAM	4+		To be upgraded.
Anti-aircraft guns
Skynex	Germany	Self-propelled anti-aircraft gun	8	2	
ZU-23-2	Soviet Union	Towed AA gun			

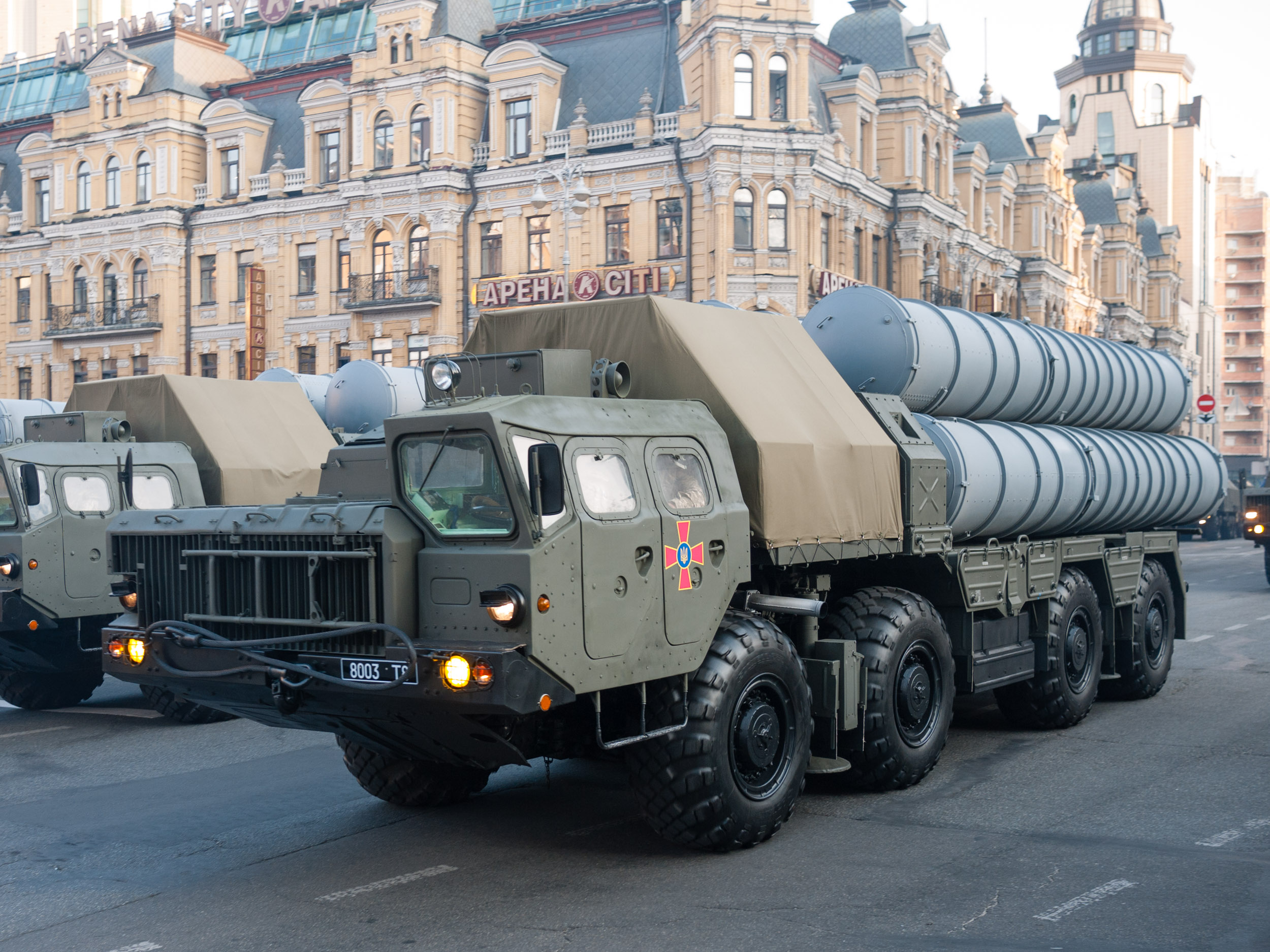
S-300PS TEL in Kyiv, 2021

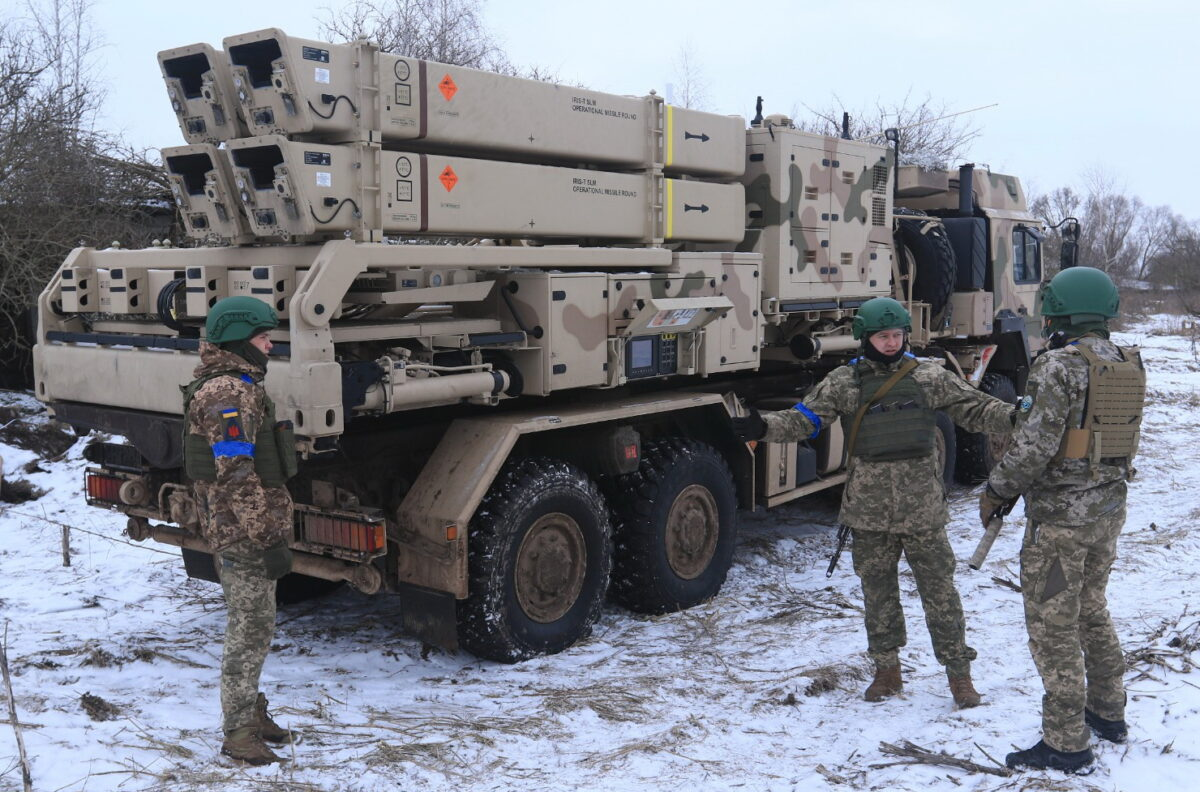
IRIS-T SLM SAM Air defense system

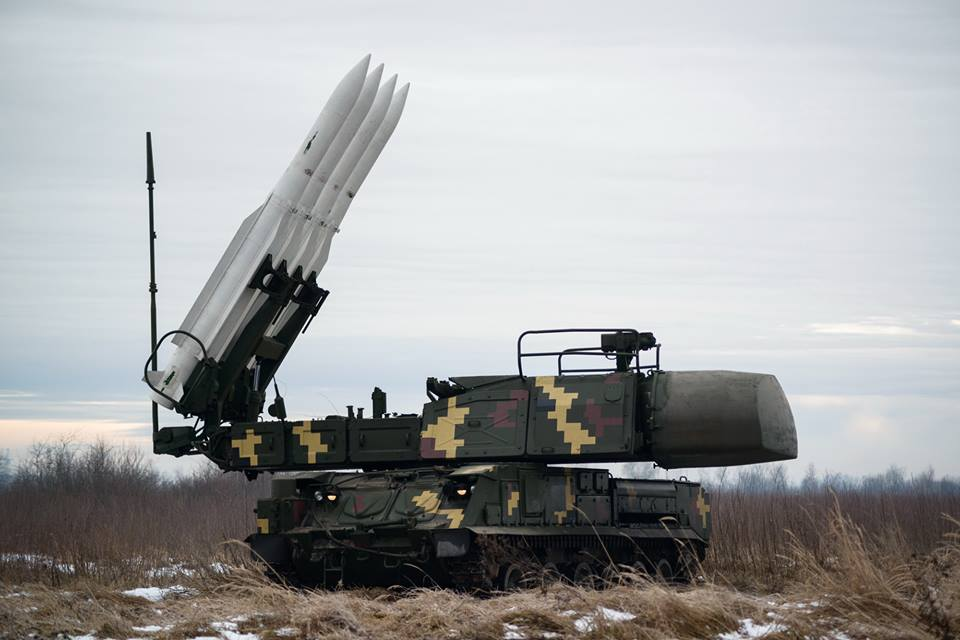
9K37 Buk M1 SAM Air Defense system

=== Radars ===
Model	Country of origin	Type	Number	Details
P-14	Soviet Union	Early-warning radar	N/A	
P-18	Soviet Union	Early-warning radar	N/A	Being modernized to the P-18C standard. The Lithuanian P-18ML and Ukrainian P-18 "Malakhit" modernisation have both been seen in use.
P-19	Soviet Union	Mobile surveillance radar	N/A	
P-35	Soviet Union	Early-warning radar	N/A	
1L22 "Parol"	Soviet Union	Mobile radar	N/A	
PRV-11	Soviet Union	Towed radar	N/A	
PRV-13	Soviet Union	Towed radar	N/A	
PRV-16	Soviet Union	Mobile radar	N/A	In service during the Russian invasion of Ukraine. The Lithuanian modernsation PRV-16ML has been seen in use.
R-410	Soviet Union	Tropospheric scatter	N/A	
36D6 'Tin Shield	Soviet Union	Air surveillance radar	1+	Part of the S-300 radar complex. 1 donated by Slovakia.
5N66M 'Clam Shell'	Soviet Union	Target acquisition radar	1+	Part of the S-300 radar complex. 1 donated by Slovakia.
5N63S 'Flap Lid B'	Soviet Union	Engagement/fire-control radar	1+	Fire control radar for S-300. 1 donated by Slovakia.
SURN 1S91	Soviet Union	Target acquisition and distribution radar	3+	Part of the 2K12 Kub radar complex. 1 donated by Slovakia. 2 donated by Czech Republic.
AN/MPQ-61	United States	Pulse acquisition radar	1	Provided with the MIM-23 Hawk battery donated by Spain in December 2022.
AN/MPQ-62	United States	CW acquisition radar	1	Provided with the MIM-23 Hawk battery donated by Spain in December 2022.
AN/MPQ-64 Sentinel	United States	Towed air surveillance radar	8	
TRML	Germany	Early-warning radar	9	
Ground Master 200	France	Mobile air surveillance radar	1	Contract signed between Ukraine and Thales for 2 systems.
Thomson-CSF RAC 3D	France	Air surveillance radar	1	Provided by Spain with the Aspide 2000 battery.
PS-90	Sweden	Early warning Radar	1	
VERA passive radar	Czech Republic	Long range passive radar	4	Pledged by the Netherlands.

== Branches of the Air Force ==
Troop badges of the Air Force

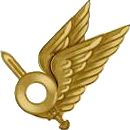
Aviation

Anti-aircraft missile troops

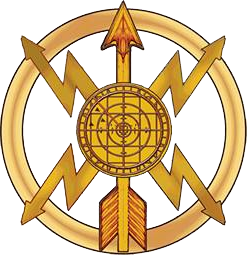
Radio engineering troops

=== Anti-Aircraft Missile Defense Forces ===
The Anti-Aircraft Missile Defense Forces Corps were created after the 2004 merger of the Air Force and the Ukrainian Air Defense Forces. It allowed the Armed Forces of Ukraine to adopt the tri-service structure, common to most modern armed forces in the world as of present. Personnel of this force fall under the direct control of the Ukrainian Air Force General Command.

They are dedicated to anti-air defense operations in defense of air force bases and facilities and other structures of state as well as economic complexes and others as mandated by law, as well as provide support to elements of the Ground Forces, Marine Corps and Navy in combat operations.

== Structure ==
The structure is as follows:

Ukrainian Air Force
Commands
Name	Components	Commander	Location
Air Force General Command	Training Command, Air Logistics Command, Air Operations Command	Lt. Gen. Mykola Oleshchuk	Vinnytsia
Air Command West		Maj. Gen. Borys Henov	Lviv
Air Command Center		Lt. Gen. Anatolii Kryvonozhko	Vasylkiv
Air Command South		Maj. Gen. Dmytro Karpenko	Odesa
Air Command East		Maj. Gen. Ivan Terebukha	Dnipro
Aviation Corps
Name	Equipment	Higher Command	Air Base
7th Tactical Aviation Brigade	Su-24M/MR	Air Force General Command	Starokostiantyniv Air Base
15th Transport Aviation Brigade	An-24, An-26, An-30B, Tu-134A-3, Mi-8	Air Force General Command	Boryspil International Airport
25th Transport Aviation Brigade	Il-76M/MD, Il-78, An-26	Air Force General Command	N/A (before the war Melitopol Air Base)
39th Tactical Aviation Brigade	Su-27	Air Command "Central"	Ozerne Air Base
40th Tactical Aviation Brigade	MiG-29	Air Command "Central"	Vasylkiv Air Base
107th Aviation Wing	F-16	Various	Various
114th Tactical Aviation Brigade	MiG-29	Air Command "West"	Ivano-Frankivsk Air Base
203rd Training Aviation Brigade	L-39, An-26, Mi-2	National Air Force University	N/A (before the war Chuhuiv Air Base)
204th Tactical Aviation Brigade	MiG-29 & Mirage 2000	Air Command "West"	Lutsk Air Base
299th Tactical Aviation Brigade	Su-25	Air Force General Command	Kulbakino Air Base
383rd Unmanned Aircraft Brigade	Bayraktar TB2	Air Force General Command	Khmelnytskyi Air Base
456th Transport Aviation Brigade	An-12, An-24, An-26, Mi-8	Air Force General Command	Havryshivka Air Base
831st Tactical Aviation Brigade	Su-27	Air Command "Central"	Myrhorod Air Base
Anti-Aircraft Defense Missile Artillery Corps
Name	Equipment	Higher Command	Location
Brigades
96th Anti-Aircraft Missile Brigade	S-300PS, Patriot	Air Command "Central"	Danylivka
138th Anti-Aircraft Missile Brigade	S-300PS, S-300PT, Patriot	Air Command "East"	Dnipro
160th Anti-Aircraft Missile Brigade	S-300PS	Air Command "South"	Odesa
201st Anti-Aircraft Missile Brigade	S-300PS, S-300V1	Air Command "South"	Pervomaisk
208th Anti-Aircraft Missile Brigade	S-300PS, S-300PT	Air Command "South"	Kherson
Regiments
11th Anti-Aircraft Missile Regiment	Buk-M1	Air Command "West"	Shepetivka
14th Anti-aircraft Missile Regiment	MIM-23 Hawk	Air Command "Central"	Poltava Oblast
156th Anti-Aircraft Missile Regiment	Buk-M1	Air Command "Central"	Zolotonosha
210th Anti-Aircraft Missile Regiment	S-300V1	Air Command "Central"	Uman
223rd Anti-Aircraft Missile Regiment	Buk-M1	Air Command "West"	Stryi
225th Anti-Aircraft Missile Regiment	Unspecified	Air Command "East"	Poltava
301st Anti-Aircraft Missile Regiment	S–300PS	Air Command "East"	Nikopol
302nd Anti-Aircraft Missile Regiment	S–300PT	Air Command "East"	Kharkiv
540th Anti-Aircraft Missile Regiment	S–300PS, S–300PT	Air Command "West"	Kamianka-Buzka
Radio-Technical Troops
Name	Equipment	Higher Command	Location
1st Radio Technical Brigade		Air Command "West"	Lypniki
14th Radio Technical Brigade		Air Command "South"	Odesa
19th Special Purpose Radio Intercept Brigade		Air Force General Command	Halytsynov
138th Radio Technical Brigade		Air Command "Central"	Vasylkiv
164th Radio Technical Brigade		Air Command "East"	Kharkiv
Signal Corps
Name	Equipment	Higher Command	Location
31st Communication Regiment		Air Command "Central"	Kyiv
43rd Communication Regiment		Air Command "South"	Odesa
57th Communication Regiment		Air Command "East"	Dnipro
76th Communication Regiment		Air Command "West"	Lypniki
101st Communication Regiment		Air Force General Command	Vinnytsia
182nd Communication Regiment		Air Force General Command	Vinnytsia
Electronic Warfare Corps
Name	Equipment	Higher Command	Location
17th Electronic Warfare Battalion		Air Command "West"	Kolomyia
1194th Electronic Warfare Battalion		Air Command "South"	Pervomaisk
2204th Electronic Warfare Battalion		Air Command "Central"	Vasylkiv
Air Force ground forces
Name	Equipment	Higher Command	Location
1st Air Force Rifle Brigade		Air Force General Command	
28th Airfield Engineer Battalion		Air Command "South"	Mykolaiv
352nd Airfield Engineer Battalion		Air Command "West"	Khmelnytskyi

== Geographic distribution ==
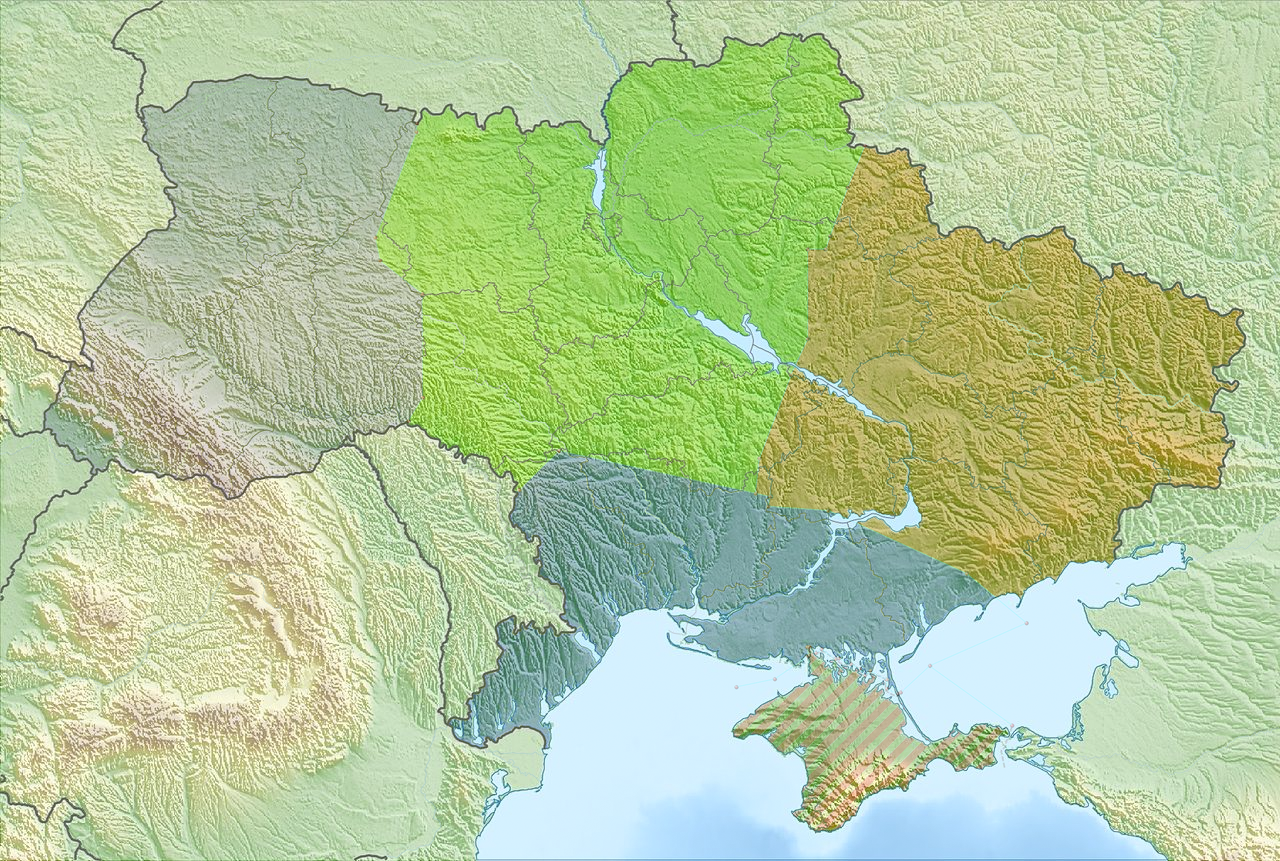
Ukrainian Air Force locations in 2018
Brigades: Fighter, Fighter/Attack, Transport, Training, S-300 Air-defense, Radio-technical (Radar)
Regiments: S-300 Air-defense, Buk-M1 Air-defense, Other, Auxiliary Airfield

== Military ranks ==
=== Officers ===
Rank group	General/Flag/Air officers				Senior officers			Junior officers
Ukrainian Air Force
Ukrainian Air Force	Генерал; Heneral	Генерал-лейтенант; Heneral-leytenant	Генерал-майор; Heneral-mayor	Бригадний генерал Bryhadnyy heneral	Полковник; Polkovnyk	Підполковник; Pidpolkovnyk	Майор; Mayor	Капітан; Kapitan	Старший лейтенант Starshyy leytenant	Лейтенант; Leytenant	Молодший лейтенант Molodshyy leytenant

=== Other ranks and NCOs ===
Rank group	Senior NCOs						Junior NCOs		Enlisted
Ukrainian Air Force
Ukrainian Air Force	Головний майстер-сержант Holovnyi maister-serzhant	Старший майстер-сержант Starshyi maister-serzhant	Майстер-сержант; Maister-serzhant	Штаб-сержант; Shtab-serzhant	Головний сержант Holovnyi serzhant	Старший сержант Starshyi serzhant	Сержант; Serzhant	Молодший сержант Molodshyi serzhant	Старший солдат Starshyi soldat	Солдат; Soldat

== Training ==
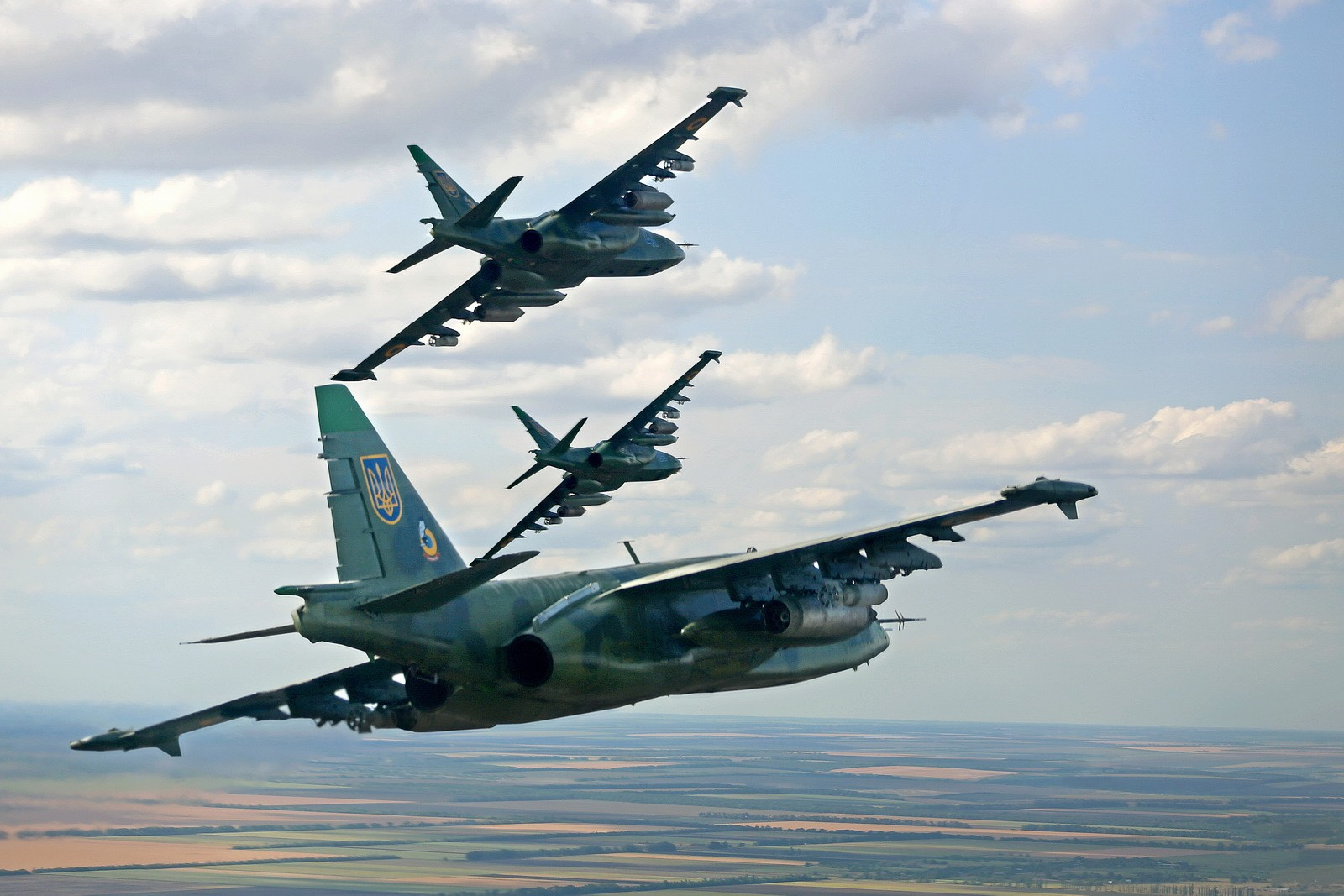
Ukrainian Su-25s

Training activities have taken on a qualitatively new character due to their complexity, including the simultaneous employment of all branches of the Air Force aviation, anti-aircraft artillery and radar troops in close teamwork with units of other armed services of the Armed Forces. Operational and combat training has included the following activities:

1. Aviation units have performed more than 6,000 tasks in combat scenarios (including more than 1,500 air battles and interceptions, 629 firing at land-based targets, 530 bombings, 21 launches of air missiles, 454 tasks in aerial surveillance, 454 airborne landings, 740 airlifts, 575 flight shifts for a total of 10,553 flying hours);
2. Five tactical flying missions in a squadron, 14 in a pair and 5 in a flight organization have been carried out to perform the assigned combat tasks, and 54 pilots have been trained to perform specific tasks in difficult meteorological conditions;
3. The number of flight crews being trained to defend the air space of the country and counter-terrorism air operations has almost doubled from 46 in 2005 to 90 in 2006; the units of anti-aircraft artillery and radar troops carried out 50 maneuvers involving redeployment, with each operator tracking 70 and 140 real and simulated targets, respectively.

In early September 2007, the Ukrainian Air Force conducted the most large-scale training of its aircraft to date. As the Defense Minister of Ukraine, Anatoliy Hrytsenko stated, "The most large-scale, during the whole 16 years of the Ukrainian independence, training of fighting aircraft, which defends our air space, was carried out during September 4–5". According to him, they fulfilled 45 battle launches of air-to-air missile, out of them 22 during the day and 23 at night. 35 pilots confirmed their high skills during the training. Hrytsenko stressed that 100% of air targets were hit.

The Kharkiv State Aircraft Manufacturing Company developed the KhAZ-30 ultralight trainer for the Ukrainian Airforce. The aircraft is designed for elementary pilot training as an introductory aircraft before recruits move on the more advanced Aero L-39 Albatros trainer.

=== Invasion of Ukraine ===
Shooting down cruise missiles became important as the war progressed, so pilots received specialist training. The same tactics are used to intercept drones. Pilots use their infrared search and track to detect cruise missiles and drones by their heat signature. They were trained to do this using simulators. Whereas most cruise missiles fly low and are hard to detect, Russian cruise missiles leave a heat signature from their “conventional two-circuit jet engines”. President Zelenskyy singled out the 204th Tactical Aviation Brigade for praise in shooting down drones. As surface-to-air missiles run out the fighters are called upon to do more work.

== Notable people ==
- Denys Vasyliuk (1993–2024), Ukrainian fighter pilot
- Juice (pilot) (Andrii Pilshchykov)

== See also ==
- Air National Guard (Ukraine) - Aerial Comment of the National Guard of Ukraine
- Ukrainian Falcons - aerobatic demonstration team
