= Ukrainian Air Defence Forces =

- Війська протиповітряної оборони України
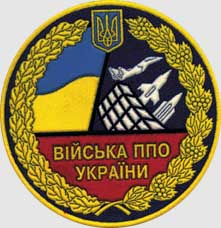
- Insignia
- Active: 1992–2004
- Disbanded: 2004
- Country: Ukraine
- Type: Air defence forces
- Garrison/HQ: Kyiv

The Ukrainian Air Defence Forces (UADF; Ukrainian: Війська протиповітряної оборони України, romanized: Vijśka protypovitrianoï oborony Ukraïny) were an anti-aircraft military service of Ukraine, active from 1992 to 2004.

They were established on the basis of the former Soviet 8th Air Defence Army, and the last commander of that army, Lieutenant General Mykhailo Lopatin, became the first commander of the Ukrainian Air Defence Forces.

== History ==
From January 24, 1992, after the collapse of the USSR, 28th Air Defense Corps, previously subordinate to 2nd Air Defence Army was transferred under the 8th Air Defence Army of Ukraine. Units stationed in Moldova were transferred to the Moldovan Armed Forces (275th Guards Anti-Aircraft Rocket Brigade, battalions and companies from the 14th Radio-Technical Brigade).

There were approximately 67,000 air defense troops in Ukraine in 1992. The new Air Defence Forces headquarters was formed on the basis of the HQ 8th Air Defence Army. There were three air defence corps: the 28th (Lviv), 49th (Odesa), and 60th (Dnipropetrovsk). All three air defence corps were taken over by Ukraine on 1 February 1992. The 28th ADC became the Western AD Region on 1 June 1992.

The Military Balance 95/96 said that six fighter regiments had been disbanded. (p. 71)

The Air Defence Forces expanded in July 1996 through the transfer of the air defence brigades and nondivisional air defence regiments of the Ukrainian Ground Forces in order to centralize the control of air defense assets. This shift transitioned away from the Soviet practice of placing some air defence units under ground forces control. These units included the 68th and 77th Separate Radio-Technical Brigades, the 138th, 223rd, 46th, 156th, 108th and 55th Anti-Aircraft Missile Brigades, the 1046th, 1067th Anti-Aircraft Missile Regiments, and the 1094th Anti-Aircraft Artillery Regiment.

After the accidental shooting down of Siberia Airlines Flight 1812 in October 2001, the commander of the Ukrainian Air Defence Forces, Colonel general Volodymyr Tkachov, first offered to resign and then was dismissed from his post. An anti-aircraft exercise being run from a training area in the Crimea had gone wrong, and a surface-to-air missile destroyed the plane.

In 2004, the Air Defence Forces were amalgamated with the Ukrainian Air Force, becoming the Anti-Air Defence Missile Artillery of the Ukrainian Air Force (Ukrainian: Зенітні ракетні війська протиповітряної оборони ПC, romanized: Zenitni raketni viysʹka protypovitryanoyi oborony PS). The merger of the services thus enabled the Armed Forces of Ukraine to adopt the tri-service structure, common to most modern armed forces in the world, in a historic break with the Soviet precedence. In that capacity as a speciality of the force, Ukrainian Air Defense became involved in the long Russo-Ukrainian War from the 2010s and onward. The modern day AADMA-AF reports as an operating service arm under the office of the Commander of the Air Force with units operating all over the country.

== Units in the early 1990s ==
The first issue of the International Institute for Strategic Studies' Military Balance after the Soviet collapse, 1992–93, listed one Air Defence army, 270 combat aircraft, and seven regiments of Su-15s (80), MiG-23s (110) and MiG-25s (80). By March 1994 Air Forces Monthly reported three air defence regions:

- the Southern with the 62nd and 737th Fighter Aviation Regiments
- the Western with the 92nd (transferred from 14th Air Army and based at Mukachevo), 179th, and 894th Fighter Aviation Regiments (from 28th AD Corps/2nd Air Defence Army)
- the Central with the 146th (Vasylkiv), 636th (Kramatorsk, disbanded in 1996 and its Su-15s broken up for scrap), and 933rd Fighter Aviation Regiments

Аt the time of the formation of the Air Defence Forces of Ukraine, the ADF-UKR was organized into:

General Command of the Air Defence Forces of Ukraine (Kyiv)

- 228th Separate Mixed Air Regiment (Kyiv-Zhuliany), the liaison unit of the service, flying An-26, An-24 and Mi-8
- ATC and radar units supporting the flights of the fighter aviation:
  - radiotechnical battalions (ртб): Belbek, Ay-Petri, Kramatorsk, Dnipropetrovsk-Kaydaki, Zaporozhye, Ozernoe, Vasilkiv, Striy, Kerch, Uman, Uzhhorod, Vladymyr-Volynsky, Kotovsk, Izmayl, Chernivtsi, Kamenka-Bugskaya
  - separate radiotechnical companies (орлр): Tarkhankut, Feodosiya, Poltava, Melitopol, Vinnytsia, Popelnya, Limanskoye, Zmiyinyy
- 28th Corps of Air Defence (Lviv)
  - 38th Communications Center (Lviv)
  - 17th EW Battalion
  - 894th Fighter Aviation Regiment AD (Ozerne Air Base), flying MiG-23ML/MLD/UB
  - 179th Fighter Aviation Regiment AD (Striy Air Base), flying MiG-23MLD (until 1988 an Air Forces fighter-bomber regiment)
  - 254th Missile Air Defence Regiment (Mukachevo)
  - 270th Missile Air Defence Regiment (Striy)
  - 438th Missile Air Defence Regiment (Kovel)
  - 521st Missile Air Defence Regiment (Borshchiv)
  - 540th Missile Air Defence Regiment (Kamenka-Buzka)
  - 1st Radiotechnical Brigade (Lipniki)
- 49th Corps of Air Defence (Kyiv), formed in 1989 from the 9th, 11th and 19th AD divisions.
  - Separate Transport Air Detachment (Dnipropetrovsk-Kaydaki Airfield), flying An-26 and Mi-8
  - 146th Guards Fighter Aviation Regiment AD (Vasilkiv Air Base), flying 41 MiG-25PD
  - 636th Fighter Aviation Regiment AD (Kramatorsk Air Base), flying 39 Su-15TM
  - 933rd Fighter Aviation Regiment AD (Dnipropetrovsk-Kaydaki Air Base), flying 40 MiG-25PDS/PU (disbanded in 1996)
  - 96th Missile Air Defence Brigade (Vasilkiv)
  - 148th Missile Air Defence Brigade (Kharkiv)
  - 212th Missile Air Defence Brigade (Mariupol)
  - 138th Missile Air Defence Regiment (Dnipropetrovsk)
  - 276th Missile Air Defence Regiment (Svitlovodsk)
  - 317th Missile Air Defence Regiment (Luhansk)
  - 392nd Guards Missile Air Defence Regiment (Uman)
  - 508th Missile Air Defence Regiment (Donetsk)
  - 613th Missile Air Defence Regiment (Kriviy Rih)
  - 138th Radiotechnical Brigade (Vasilkiv)
  - 164th Radiotechnical Brigade (Kharkiv)
- 60th Corps of Air Defence (Odesa), formed in 1989 from the 1st and 21st AD divisions.
  - Separate Transport Air Detachment (Odesa-Shkolniy Airfield), flying An-26 and Mi-8
  - 62nd Fighter Aviation Regiment AD (Belbek), flying Su-27P and Su-15TM
  - 737th Fighter Aviation Regiment AD (Chervonoglinskaya-Artsiz Air Base), flying MiG-23MLD (came from Afghanistan, disbanded in 1990)
  - 738th Fighter Aviation Regiment AD (Zaporizhzhia-Mokre Air Base), flying MiG-25PDS (disbanded in 1990, aircraft transferred to the 152nd FAR AD at Ak-Tepe Air Base, Turkmenistan SSR)
  - 100th Missile Air Defence Brigade (Zaporizhzhia)
  - 160th Missile Air Defence Brigade (Odesa)
  - 174th Missile Air Defence Brigade (Sevastopol)
  - 208th Guards Missile Air Defence Brigade (Kherson)
  - 1014th Guards Missile Air Defence Regiment (Feodosiya)
  - 1170th Missile Air Defence Regiment (Mykolaiv)
  - 14th Radiotechnical Brigade (Odesa)
  - 16th Radiotechnical Brigade (Sevastopol)

== Current organization as branch of the Air Force ==
- Under Air Command West:
  - 11th Anti-Aircraft Missile Regiment, Shepetivka (Buk-M1)
  - 223rd Anti-Aircraft Missile Regiment, Stryi (Buk-M1)
  - 540th Anti-Aircraft Missile Regiment, Kamianka-Buzka (S-300PS)
  - 1st Radio-technical Brigade, Lypnyky
  - 17th Electronic Warfare Battalion
- Under Air Command Central:
  - 14th Anti-aircraft Missile Regiment, Poltava Oblast (MIM-23 Hawk)
  - 96th Anti-Aircraft Missile Brigade, Danylivka (S-300PS)
  - 156th Anti-aircraft Missile Regiment, Zolotonosha (Buk-M1)
  - 201st Anti-aircraft Missile Brigade
  - 138th Radio-technical Brigade, Vasylkiv
- Under Air Command East:
  - 138th Anti-aircraft Missile Brigade, Dnipro (S-300PS)
  - 301st Anti-aircraft Missile Regiment, Nikopol (S-300PS)
  - 302nd Anti-aircraft Missile Regiment, (S-300PS)
  - 164th Radio-technical Brigade, Kharkiv
    - 2215th Radio-technical Battalion, Avdiivka
    - 2315th Radio-technical Battalion, Rohan
    - 2316th Radio-technical Battalion, Zaporizhzhia
    - 2323rd Radio-technical Battalion, Mariupol
- Under Air Command South (includes Russian-controlled Task Force Crimea):
  - 160th Anti-aircraft Missile Brigade, Odesa (S-300PM)
  - 208th Anti-aircraft Missile Brigade, Kherson (S-300PS)
  - 201st Anti-aircraft Missile Brigade, Pervomaisk (S-300PS)
  - 14th Radio-technical Brigade, Odesa
    - Radio-technical Battalion, Kherson
    - Radio-technical Battalion, Podilsk
  - 1194th Electronic Warfare Battalion
  - 174th Anti-Aircraft Artillery regiment (Derhachi near Sevastopol. S-400)
  - 50th Anti-Aircraft Artillery regiment (Feodosiya. S-400)
  - 55th Anti-Aircraft Artillery regiment (Yevpatoriya. Buk-M1)
- Directly reporting air defense formations
  - 19th Radio Intercept and ELINT Regiment (Special Purpose)
  - 20th Special Signals and Radio-technical Equipment Repair Center

== Current and historical equipment ==
Currently in service in the Air Force Anti-Air Missile Defense Artillery Forces including those inherited from the Ukrainian ADF upon merger:

- 9K35 Strela-10, 9K330 Tor tracked mobile anti-air defense short range surface-to-air missile launchers
- 9K33 Osa wheeled mobile anti-air defense short range surface-to-air missile launchers
- Crotale R440 truck-towed anti-air defense short range surface-to-air missile launchers
- S-125 Neva/Pechora truck mounted anti-air defense short range surface-to-air missile launchers
- S-125 Newa SC tracked anti-air defense short range surface-to-air missile launchers
- 2K12 Kub, Buk-M1 tracked mobile anti-air defense medium range surface-to-air missile launchers
- MIM-23 Hawk, NASAMS, IRIS-T, Pantsir-S1, Aspide truck-mounted mobile anti-air defense medium range surface-to-air missile launchers
- S-300PS, S-300 PM/PMU truck-mounted mobile anti-air defense long range surface-to-air missile launchers
- MIM-104 Patriot truck-mounted anti-air defense medium/long range surface-to-air missile launchers
- ZSU-23-4 Shilka, Flakpanzer Gepard tracked armoured short range self-propelled anti-aircraft guns for defense of air force bases and installations as well as mobile range AAA defense in support of formations of the Ground Forces
- KS-30, AZP S-60, ZU-23-2, ZPU series, Zastava M55 towed or truck mounted short range anti-aircraft guns for defense of air force bases and installations
- Bofors 40 mm Automatic Gun L/70 towed or truck mounted short range anti-aircraft guns, can also be operated on fixed sites for defense of air force bases and installations

Retired from both the Ukrainian ADF and/or the Air Force:

- S-75 Dvina, S-200 truck-towed anti-air defense long range surface-to-air missile launchers
- 2K11 Krug tracked mobile anti-air defense medium range surface-to-air missile launchers

Future purchases by the Air Force Anti-Air Defense:

- SAMP-T Eurosam Aster-30 Mamba truck-mounted anti-air defense medium/long range surface-to-air missile launchers
- Skyshield fixed or truck-mounted mobile short range anti-aircraft guns for defense of air force bases and installations
- RIM-7 Sea Sparrow tracked or truck mounted anti-air defense short range surface-to-air missile launchers, the former mounted on Buk chassis

Retired aircraft of the Ukrainian ADF:

- Sukhoi Su-15, Mikoyan-Gurevich MiG-23, Mikoyan-Gurevich MiG-25, Sukhoi Su-27 fighters
- Antonov An-24, Antonov An-26 transport aircraft
- Mil Mi-8 transport and air reconnisance helicopters

== Commanders ==
- 1992 – 1996 Lieutenant General Mykhailo Lopatin
- 1996 – 2000 Lieutenant General Oleksandr Stetsenko
- 2000 – 2001 Colonel General Volodymyr Tkachov
- 2001 – 2004 Colonel General Anatoliy Toropchyn
