= 540th Anti-aircraft Missile Brigade (Ukraine) =

540th Anti-Aircraft Missile Brigade 540th Anti-Aircraft Missile Regiment (1992–2025)
- 540-а зенітно-ракетна бригада
- Active: 1960 – present
- Country: Ukraine; Soviet Union (1960–1991)
- Allegiance: Armed Forces of Ukraine
- Branch: Ukrainian Air Force
- Type: Air Defense Troops
- Role: Air Defense
- Size: Brigade
- Part of: Air Command West
- Garrison/HQ: Kamianka-Buzka and Lutsk Air Base
- Nicknames: Ivan Vyhovsky Brigade; Lviv Brigade
- Patron: Ivan Vyhovsky
- Mottos: Vigilance and accuracy
- Equipment: S-300PT, Gepard, TRML-4D
- Engagements: Russo-Ukrainian war: War in Donbas; Full scale invasion 2022
- Decorations: For Courage and Bravery
- Website: Official Facebook page

Commanders
- Notable commanders: Lt. Gen. Viacheslav Shamko

Insignia
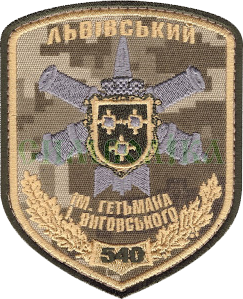
- Former Insignia

The 540th Lvivska Anti-Aircraft Missile Brigade named after Hetman Ivan Vyhovsky (MUN A4623) is a brigade of the Ukrainian Air Force tasked with air defense operations throughout Lviv Oblast and Volyn Oblast. It operates soviet and german made missile defense systems and is subordinated to the Air Command West. It is headquartered at Kamianka-Buzka and Lutsk Air Bases.

== History ==
In 1992, following the Dissolution of the Soviet Union, the personnel of the 540th Anti-aircraft Missile Regiment swore allegiance to Ukraine.

On 21 April 1999, the honorary name "Lviv" was assigned to the regiment.

On 23 June 2006, a combat flag was presented to the regiment.

In 2008, the regiment was assigned the honorary name of "Ivan Vyhovsky" who was the Hetman of the Zaporozhian Host during the 17th Century.

In 2012, the unit provided air defense operations for Euro 2012.

On October 30, 2013, the regiment was the last to operate S-200B but they were stripped off from the regiment as its S-200 division ceased to exist.

In 2019, the regiment won the annual competition for the title "Best S-300 Anti-Aircraft Missile Division" and won the main prize - 180,000 hryvnias after successfully destroying most targets.

In March 2021, the regiment's division was deployed in the Volyn Oblast at the Lutsk Air Base to strengthen the air defense in a new sector of responsibility.

=== Russo-Ukrainian war ===
The base of the regiment, the Lutsk Air Base was the target of Russian airstrikes by Russian armed forces on 27 February and 11 March 2022. and the airbase was completely destroyed, according to the town mayor.

On 5 August 2023, the 540th regiment was awarded the honorary award "For Courage and Bravery".

In 2024, the Ukrainian Air Force received S-200 longe-range anti-aircraft missiles, and they were inducted into the regiment, equipped with modern electronics.

In 2025 the unit was expanded to a Brigade.

== Structure ==
The structure of the brigade is as follows

540th Anti-aircraft Missile Brigade
  - 5401st Anti-aircraft Missile Division (S-200D) (Novy Stav)
  - 5402nd Anti-aircraft Missile Division (S-300PT) (Batyatichi)
  - 5403rd Anti-aircraft Missile Division (S-300PT) (Yavoriv)
  - 5404th Anti-aircraft Missile Division (S-300PT) (Semenivka)

== Commanders ==
- Colonel Golushko Yury Ivanovich (1992–1996)
- Colonel Viktor Oleksiyovych Machok (1996–1999)
- Colonel Viacheslav Evgenovich Shamko (1999–2001)
- Colonel Oleg Vasylovych Strutsynskyi (2001–2003)
- Colonel Ivan Stepanovych Zinko (2003–2006)
- Colonel Storozhenko Volodymyr Vasyliovych (2006–2010)
- Colonel Humeniuk Oleksandr Leonidovych (2011–2017)
- Colonel Vitaly Viktorovych Palaguta (2017–2018)

== See also ==
- 11th Anti-aircraft Missile Brigade
- 223rd Anti-aircraft Missile Regiment
- 1039th Anti-aircraft Missile Regiment

== Sources ==
- 8-а армія ППО
- 540-й Львівський зенітний ракетний полк імені Івана Виговського відзначив 70-річчя від дня створення
- Військові частини Повітряних Сил за родами військ
