= Air Command East =

- Повітряне командування «Схід»
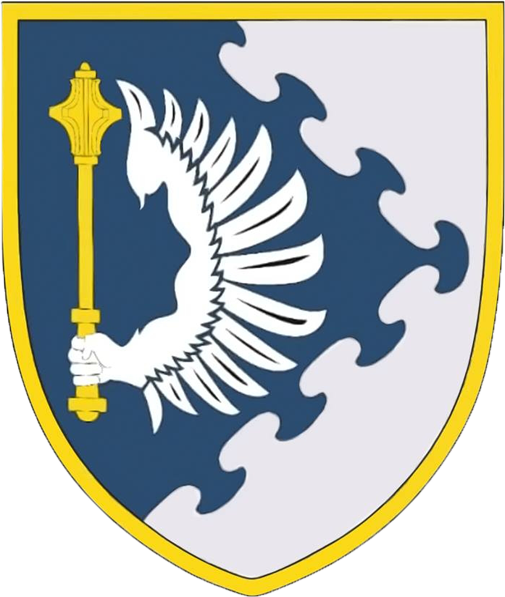
- Active: 2016-present
- Country: Ukraine
- Allegiance: Armed Forces of Ukraine
- Branch: Ukrainian Air Force
- Type: Command
- Garrison/HQ: Dnipro
- Website: Official Facebook page

Commanders
- Current commander: Ivan Terebukha

Insignia
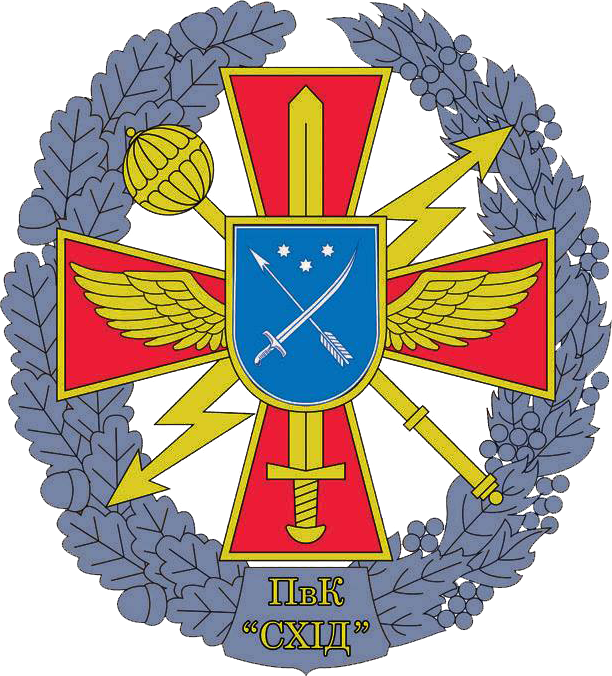
- Emblem

Air Command "East" (MUN A2533) is the military unit of the Ukrainian Air Force located in the eastern part of Ukraine.

== History ==
According to the Decree of the President of Ukraine No. 277/2002, a zone of responsibility was provided for the Ukrainian Air Force, but the military-administrative division that appeared on the basis of the Decree of the President of Ukraine No. 39/2016 of 5 February 2016 was not taken into account.

Air Command East, which was in the stage of formation since the summer of 2016, and already in October 2016, it took part in the exercises "Rubizh - 2016", where in cooperation with other military formations of Ukraine, it practiced various tasks.

On January 23, 2017, the President of Ukraine, Petro Poroshenko issued Decree No. 12/2017, which amended the military-administrative division of Ukraine and created the "East" military air zone, hence the Air Command East.

Before the creation of this air military zone, the temporarily occupied territories of Donetsk and Luhansk regions belonged to the "Center" air military zone

On 17 February of the same year, the personnel of the "PvK "East"" of the Armed Forces of Ukraine entered combat duty in the air defense system of Ukraine for the first time.

On 16 July 2017, in the premises of the Academic Ukrainian Music and Drama Theater named after T. Shevchenko, the personnel and command of PvK "East" celebrated its first anniversary.

Since the beginning of the full-scale invasion on 24 February 2022, more than 2,100 air targets (500 missiles of various types, 51 combat aircraft, 14 helicopters, more than 1,500 attack and reconnaissance UAVs) have been destroyed by air defense in the area of responsibility of the East Air Force Base.

== Organization ==
The composition of the Air Command "East" includes:

Air Command East

- 57th separate regiment of communication and radio technical support (Dnipro)
- 164th radio engineering brigade (Kharkiv)
- 138th anti-aircraft missile brigade (Dnipro; S-300PT)
- 225th anti-aircraft missile regiment (Poltava region)
- 301st Anti-Aircraft Missile Regiment (Nikopol, Dnipropetrovsk Region; S-300PS)
- 302nd Anti-Aircraft Missile Regiment (Kharkiv; S-300PS)
- 196th command and control center
- 46th Guard and Service Command
- 85th Aviation Commandant's Office (Kramatorsk, Donetsk region)

== Leadership ==
=== Commanders ===
- Major General Viacheslav Shamko (2016)
- Colonel Valentyn Lystopad (2017)
- Major General Oleh Strutsinskyi (2018 - 8 December 2020).
- Major General Ivan Terebukha (8 December 2020-present)

== See also ==
- Air Command Center
- Air Command South
- Air Command West
