= Ivan Terebukha =

- Native name: Іван Миколайович Теребуха
- Born: Ivan Mykolayovych Terebukha; 7 July 1966 (age 60); Liuboml, Ukraine, Soviet Union
- Allegiance: Ukraine
- Rank: Major general
- Conflicts: Russo-Ukrainian War

Ivan Mykolayovych Terebukha (Ukrainian: Іван Миколайович Теребуха; born on 7 July 1966), is a Ukrainian army officer who is currently the Commander of the Air Command East since 8 December 2020.

He is a major general as of 2007.

== Biography ==
Ivan Terebukha was born on 7 July 1966 in Lyuboml. His father, Mykola, was a serviceman in the military unit. Ivan was released from Lyuboml School No. 2.

From 2004 between 2008, he was the commander of the tactical group "Crimea" of the Air Command "South". On 21 January 2007, he was promoted to a major general.

In 2008, Terebukha became the first deputy commander of the Air Command West.

From June 2014 to December 2020, he became the Chief of Staff – First Deputy Commander of Air Command South.

On 8 December 2020, Terebukha became the commander of Air Command East. At the same time, he holds the position of Deputy Commander of the CAB on aviation and air defense – the chief of aviation and air defense.

== Scientific achievements ==
Terebukha is a Candidate of Technical Sciences, Senior Researcher at the Ivan Kozhedub Kharkiv National Air Force Scientific Center of Kharkiv National Air Force.
