= 204th Tactical Aviation Brigade =

204th Tactical Aviation Brigade (2007–present) 204th Fighter Aviation Brigade (2006–2007) 9th Fighter Aviation Brigade (2000–2006) 62nd Fighter Aviation Regiment (–2000)
- 204-та бригада тактичної авіації
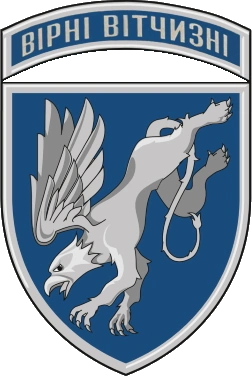
- Active: 26 September 1941 – present
- Country: Ukraine; Soviet Union (1941–1991)
- Allegiance: Armed Forces of Ukraine
- Branch: Ukrainian Air Force
- Type: Air Force Aviation
- Role: Fighter
- Size: Brigade
- Part of: Air Command West
- Garrison/HQ: Lutsk, Volyn Oblast
- Nicknames: Sevastopol, Oleksandr Pokryshkin
- Patron: Alexander Pokryshkin

Commanders
- Current commander: Mykola Mykolayovych Hayovchyk
- Notable commanders: Yuliy Mamchur

Insignia
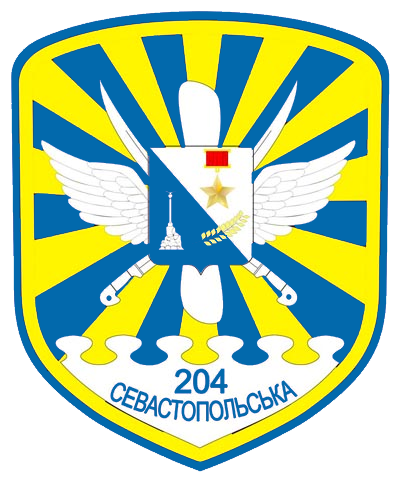
- Former sleeve patch

- Roundel

- Fin flash

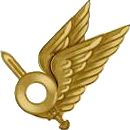
- Aviation branch insignia

Aircraft flown
- Fighter: MiG-29, MiG-29MU1
- Trainer: MiG-29UB, L-39 Albatros

The 204th Sevastopol Tactical Aviation Brigade named after Oleksandr Pokryshkin (MUN A0959) is a fighter aviation unit of the Ukrainian Air Force. The brigade is stationed at the Lutsk Air Base.

== History ==
In January 1992, the personnel of the 62nd Mixed Aviation Regiment took an oath of loyalty to the Ukrainian people. In 1996, the Ukrainian Air Force retired the Su-15TM aircraft and was replaced by the Su-27. On December 10, 1996, in connection with the 55th anniversary of the formation of the regiment, the 62nd Fighter Aviation Regiment of the 5th Aviation Corps was awarded the honorary name Sevastopol.

After the 100th Shipborne Fighter Aviation Regiment was disbanded in 1996, its MiG-29 aircraft were transferred to the 62nd Fighter Aviation Regiment. In 1998, they were driven from the airfield in Saki to Belbek airfield. On October 30, 2000, the 62nd Aviation Regiment was reorganized as the 9th Fighter Aviation Brigade. Since January 2000, the brigade is subordinate to the Air Command South, tactical group Crimea.

On June 23, 2006, the brigade was reorganized into the 204th Fighter Aviation Brigade, which was already reformed into the 204th Tactical Aviation Brigade on December 27, 2007. In 2011, three crews of MiG-29 aircraft of the brigade took part in a military parade in honor of the 20th anniversary of the Independence of Ukraine. In April 2014, in connection with the Russian annexation of Crimea, the brigade carried out a redeployment operation to the Kulbakino Air Base near Mykolaiv, and the removal of its aviation equipment and property.

On November 15, 2017, the Cabinet of Ministers of Ukraine, at the proposal of the Ministry of Defense, made a decision regarding the redeployment of military unit A0959 from Mykolaiv to Lutsk. The redeployment was carried out to build up the country's air defense in the north-western direction.

On February 15, 2018, the inspection group of the Main Inspection of the Ministry of Defense under the leadership of Major General Valeriy Romaniuk inspected the brigade at the Kulbakino Air Base near Mykolaiv. During the inspection, military inspectors assessed the organization of the work of all services of the brigade in the main directions. The representatives of the Ministry of Defense of Ukraine focused their attention on the quality of combat duty and the organization of the internal service. Also, the aviators practically carried out a set of measures to bring the military unit to a higher level of combat readiness.

In May 2018, it was reported that the brigade was planned to be relocated to the city of Lutsk. On July 31, 2018, the first aircraft from the 204th Brigade, the L-39 Albatros arrived at the Lutsk military airfield from the Kulbakino (Mykolaiv) Air Base. According to a long-standing tradition, before landing, he made a spectacular welcome pass over the main taxiway and the central refueling station of the airfield, which ended with the performance of a "barrel" aerobatics figure. On September 21, 2018, the Oleksandr Pokryshkin Sevastopol Tactical Aviation Brigade of the "West" Air Command of the Air Force of the Armed Forces of Ukraine was solemnly welcomed in Volhynia. On November 2, 2020, a place under the chapel was consecrated to meet the spiritual needs of the personnel of the brigade.

=== Patrol duty during UEFA Euro 2012 ===
The brigade performed patrols to protect the airspace of Ukraine during UEFA Euro 2012. 12 crews were prepared for duty during the UEFA Euro 2012 in the aviation units of the "South" air command. The aviators were ready to counter high-speed and low-speed air targets day and night. On May 28, 2012, a command and staff exercise was also held, in the framework of which the possibilities of connection in case of operational deployment of troops were practiced. In addition, the level of readiness of forces and means to perform tasks as assigned was checked. The pilots performed the program of training flights on MiG-29 and L-39 aircraft.

=== Annexation of Crimea by Russia ===
The 204th Brigade was nominally armed with 52 MiG-29 and MiG-29UB fighters, as well as four L-39M1 training aircraft that were modernized in Odesa. The combat readiness of the brigade was extremely poor, and by the beginning of 2014, there were 12 MiG-29 and MiG-29UB aircraft in flying condition from its fleet, of which only three MiG-29s, one MiG-29UB, and one L-39M1 were suitable for combat operations. During the Crimean events, on February 28, 2014, the Belbek airfield was captured by Russian troops, who blocked the brigade's personnel from accessing the aircraft parking lots, and disabled all four fighter jets that remained serviceable. On March 22, the 204th Brigade and all the buildings of the Belbek airfield were finally captured by Russian special forces.

Roughly half of the entire personnel of the former Ukrainian 204th Tactical Aviation Brigade betrayed the Ukrainian oath and defected to the Russian Air Force. More than 240 servicemen, or 38% of the personnel, and 11 out of 21 pilots did not betray their oath.

From April 10, 2014, in agreement with the Russian side, representatives of the Ukrainian Air Force began the operation to remove their aviation equipment and property from Crimea. The brigade was redeployed to Mykolaiv. In the spring of 2014, most of the aircraft of the Ukrainian 204th Tactical Aviation Brigade stationed at the airfield were returned to Ukraine and transported by ground transport to Mykolaiv. 43 MiG-29 and MiG-29UB, as well as 1 L-39M1, were exported from the territory of the Republic of Crimea. At the same time, all the returned planes were disassembled, each of them was missing up to 11 technical units. It was also possible to take out the aviation simulator and the combat flag of the unit.

In April 2014, the transfer of military equipment to Ukraine was suspended by the decision of the Russian Minister of Defense, Sergei Shoigu, in connection with the beginning of the Russian-Ukrainian hybrid war in the east of Ukraine. Thus, 7 Ukrainian MiG-29s (b/n 01,07,18,19,20,22,40), 2 MiG-29UB (b/n 84,85), and 3 L-39M1 (b/n 102, 103, 104), recently modernized and those that were in the best condition. In December 2018, Russian troops installed one MiG-29UB (b/n 85) and one L-39M1 (b/n 102) of the 204th Brigade as museum exhibits on the territory of the garrison in Belbek, Sevastopol, Crimea. Russian identification marks were applied to them.

=== Russo-Ukrainian War ===
Colonel Andriy Oleksandrovich Fandeev from the 204th Brigade distinguished himself. On December 2, 2014, senior lieutenant Ivan Benera died near Avdiivka. On January 31, 2018, soldier Putsulai Yan Georgiyovych died while performing a combat mission as a result of a serious wound during a two-sided battle at combat positions near the city of Avdiyivka.

== Modernization ==
As of 2012, the brigade was tasked with restoring the skills of the flight crew by types of training and various weather conditions, as well as actively conducting the training of young flight crew. The brigade was a part of the Rapid Response Forces, and was on combat duty in the air defense system. During 2012 (until November), two refurbished MiG-29 aircraft were transferred to the Sevastopol Tactical Aviation Brigade of the Southern Air Command after modernization. In November 2012, two L-39M1 aircraft also arrived at Belbek military airfield from Odesa.

On December 18, 2012, the brigade additionally updated its aircrew — two L-39M1 training aircraft and a MiG-29UB training aircraft were received from state aircraft repair enterprises. As of the end of 2013, the brigade's flight crew was updated with 7 aircraft of two types. From July 2014 to August 2018, about 20 aircraft were restored and handed over to the brigade by TEC and aircraft repair plants. Among them: MiG-29 (b/n 28, b/n 17, b/n 41, b/n 43, b/n 45, b/n 06, b/n 10, b/n 16, b/n 47 ), MiG-29MU1 (b/n 07, b/n 08), and MiG-29UB (b/n 82, b/n 86), as well as two L-39M1 (b/n 101, b/n 105).

In the summer of 2018, SE "Lviv State Aviation Repair Plant" completed the repair and modernization of the MiG-29UB fighter. The combat aircraft (b/n 83) has already been transferred directly to the 204th Tactical Aviation Brigade. On December 1, 2018, the President of Ukraine Petro Poroshenko handed over weapons and military equipment to the commanders of military units and combat vehicles. The head of state presented the relevant certificates for the equipment. The 204th Tactical Aviation Brigade received 2 repaired MiG-29s (b/n 48, b/n 49).

In December 2019, the brigade received 2 combat fighters MiG-29 (b/n 46) and MiG-29UB (b/n 81), after major repairs. In July 2020, the brigade received an overhauled MiG-29 fighter (b/n 35) at LDARZ, which was exported from Crimea in 2014. On December 22, 2020, the brigade received a repaired MiG-29 (b/n 47) fighter after being damaged during an emergency landing at the military airfield in Melitopol. On December 23, 2021, the LDARZ handed over the MiG-29 fighter (b/n 36) to the 204th Tactical Aviation Brigade after major repairs.

== Training ==
=== "Safe Skies - 2011" ===
On June 9, 2011, tactical aviation pilots were preparing to participate in the Ukrainian-American-Polish training of aviation units "Safe Skies - 2011" and the complex of tactical exercises "Adequate response - 2011". As part of training for the exercises, the pilots of the Sevastopol Tactical Aviation Brigade flew more than 20 flights on MiG-29 aircraft. In total, four MiG-29 aircraft participated in the flights. Pilots of the Ivano-Frankivsk Tactical Aviation Brigade also took part in flights in Crimea. The pilots flew day and night in difficult meteorological conditions. The pilots of the brigade also took part in the Russian-Ukrainian exercise "Fairway of Peace - 2011".

=== "Perspective-2012" ===
A pair of L-39 Albatros aircraft took off at the Angarsk training ground in Crimea participating in company-tactical training as attack aircraft that was supposed to inflict fire damage on an illegal armed formation discovered on the plateau. The planes were piloted by young fighter pilots of the brigade - lieutenants Oleksandr Zalizko and Anton Genov. Next to them in the cockpit were experienced pilots of the compound as instructors.

During the complex of research and experimental command and staff exercises with military administration bodies "Perspektiva-2012", 90% of the brigade's flight crew was involved. These company tactical exercises were conducted in accordance with the organizational and methodical instructions of the Chief of the General Staff for the second half of 2012, which provided for directing efforts specifically to the interdisciplinary training of troops.

== Structure ==
- Management (headquarters):
- 1st Aviation Squadron:
  - aviation link
  - aviation link
  - aviation link
- 2nd Aviation Squadron:
  - aviation link
  - aviation link
  - aviation link
- Airfield maintenance battalion:
  - airfield operating company
  - technical company
  - gas supply group
- Battalion of communication and radio technical support:
  - communication company
  - company of communication and radio technical support
- Guard company;
- RHC defense company;
- TECH of aviation and automotive equipment;
- Preparation and regulations group;
- Fire brigade;
- Medical center

== Commanders ==
- (2004 – 2009) Colonel Vasyl Ivanovych Chernenko
- (2011 – 2013) Colonel Oleksiy Stanislavovych Marchenko
- (2013 – 2014) Colonel Yuliy Mamchur
- (2014 – 2015) Lieutenant Colonel Maksym Ihorovych Fedynskyi
- (2015 – 2019) Colonel Ihor Leonidovych Kiselyov
- (2019 – 2022) Colonel Victor Petrovych Meretin
- (2022 – present) Colonel Mykola Mykolayovych Hayovchyk

== Traditions ==
On September 26, 2013, the President of Ukraine Viktor Yanukovych signed a Decree, by which he assigned the name of Oleksandr Pokryshkin to the 204th Sevastopol Tactical Aviation Brigade at that time PvK "Pivden" of the Air Force of the Armed Forces of Ukraine and decided to name it in the future – 204th Sevastopol Tactical Aviation Brigade named after Oleksandr Pokryshkin of the Air Force of Ukraine.

Traditions

In mid-November 2020, the 204th Sevastopol Tactical Aviation Brigade received a new emblem. The arm badge is made in the colors of the Air Force of the Armed Forces of Ukraine. The sign is made in the form of a heraldic shield with a light gray edging. The central element is a stylized image of a diving silver griffin.

== See also ==
- Sevastopol International Airport
- Ukrainian Falcons

== Sources ==
- Енциклопедія «Кримологія»: Військові формування України в Криму [DEAD]

== Links ==
- В небо Миколаївщини піднялись льотчики-винищувачі та штурмовики
- Віртуальна пілотажна група Українські Соколи: Льотчики Севастопольської бригади тактичної авіації у рамках підготовки до навчань «Безпечне небо — 2011» виконали понад 20 польотів на літаках МіГ-29
- Структура Повітряних Сил ЗС України // Ukrainian Military Pages
- "Нове будівництво на аеродромі Луцьк". militaryaviation.in.ua. Military Aviation. 2018-04-13. Archived from the original on 20 June 2018.
- "На Волинь прибув перший ешелон з технікою та майном 204-ї бригади тактичної авіації". www.ukrmilitary.com. Ukrainian Military Pages. 2018-07-17. Archived from the original on 17 July 2018.
- "Луцька авіабригада отримала другий винищувач Міг-29 за місяць". uprom.info. Національний промисловий портал. 2019-12-26. Archived from the original on 26 December 2019.
