= Defence Forces =

The phrase Defence Force(s) (or Defense Force(s) in US English - see spelling differences) is in the title of the armed forces of certain countries and territories.

== Defence forces ==
- Ambazonia Defence Forces
- Antigua and Barbuda Defence Force
- Australian Defence Force
- Bahrain Defence Force
- Barbados Defence Force
- Belize Defence Force
- Botswana Defence Force
- Bundeswehr: Federal Defence Forces of Germany.
- Burundi National Defence Force
- Danish Defence: the unified armed forces of the Kingdom of Denmark.
- Defense Forces of Georgia
- Defence Force of Haiti
- Eritrean Defence Forces
- Estonian Defence Forces
- Ethiopian National Defense Force
- Falkland Islands Defence Force
- Finnish Defence Forces
- Guyana Defence Force
- Hungarian Defence Force
- Irish Defence Forces
- Israel Defense Forces
- Jamaica Defence Force
- Japan Self-Defense Forces
- Kenya Defence Forces
- Lesotho Defence Force
- Lithuanian National Defence Volunteer Forces
- Malawian Defence Force
- Maldives National Defence Force
- Mozambique Defence Armed Forces
- Namibia Defence Force
- New Zealand Defence Force
- Norwegian Cyber Defence Force
- Papua New Guinea Defence Force
- People's Liberation Army Navy Coastal Defense Force
- People's Self-Defense Force
- Popular Defence Forces: Paramilitary force in Sudan
- Royal Bahamas Defence Force
- Royal Montserrat Defence Force
- Rwanda Defence Force
- Saint Kitts and Nevis Defence Force
- Self-Defense Forces in the multi-ethnic territories of North and East Syria.
- Seychelles People's Defence Force
- Singapore Civil Defence Force: provides emergency services in Singapore
- South African National Defence Force
- South Sudan People's Defense Forces
- Southern Cameroons Defence Forces
- State defense forces: defense forces of individual US states.
- Tanzania People's Defence Force
- Territorial Defence Force (Poland)
- Territorial Defense Forces (Ukraine)
- Tigray Defense Forces
- Timor Leste Defence Force
- Trinidad and Tobago Defence Force
- Umbutfo Eswatini Defence Force
- Uganda People's Defence Force
- Zambian Defence Force
- Zimbabwe Defence Forces

== Air Defence Forces ==
- Air defence forces (Anti-Aircraft Warfare)
- Cuban Air and Air Defense Force
- Egyptian Air Defense Forces
- Islamic Republic of Iran Air Defense Force
- Japan Air Self-Defense Force
- Kazakh Air Defense Forces: Air Force of Kazakhstan
- Pakistan Army Air Defence Command
- Royal Saudi Air Defense Forces
- Syrian Air Defense Force
- Serbian Air Force and Air Defence
- Slovenian Air Force and Air Defence
- Territorial Air Defence Forces: Part of the Algerian People's National Armed Forces
- Ukrainian Air Defence Forces
- Uzbekistan Air and Air Defence Forces

At the start of the Cold War, the United States Air Force had established the Aerospace Defense Command. It was broken into three different regions:

- Eastern Air Defense Force: (1949-1960)
- Central Air Defense Force: (1951-1960)
- Western Air Defense Force: (1949-1960)

== Defunct Defence Forces ==
- Artsakh Defence Army (1992-2023)
- British Solomon Islands Protectorate Defence Force (1889-1946)
- Ceylon Defence Force: Regular force of British Ceylon (1881-1949)
- Citizens' Defence Force: A unit of former British Army soldiers and Irish Volunteers organised by Ireland during the Irish Civil War (1922)
- Croatian Defence Forces: (1991-1993)
- Dominica Defense Force: (1974-1981)
- Wehrmacht: Wehrmacht translated to defence forces (1935-1945)
  - Fatherland Defense Force: A short-lived Wehrmacht-backed Lithuanian military unit made to defend Lithuania against the Soviet Army (1944)
- Iceland Defense Force: (1951-2006)
- Indian Defence Force: (1917-1920)
- Lithuanian Territorial Defense Force: (1944)
- Lofa Defense Force: Liberian Rebel Group (1993-1996)
- National Defence Forces (Syria): Syrian pro-government militia (2012-2024)
- Panama Defense Forces: (1968-1989)
- People's Self-Defense Force: South Vietnamese militia (1968-1975)
- Polish Air Defence Force (1962-1990)
- Royal Hong Kong Defence Force: (1960s-1970)
- Russian Aerospace Defence Forces: (2011-2015)
- South African Defence Force: (1957-1994)
- South Sudan Defence Forces (militia): (1983-2006)
- Soviet Air Defence Forces: (1918-1992)
- Sudan Defence Force: (1924-1955)
- Territorial Defence Force of the Republic of Bosnia and Herzegovina: (1990-1992)
- Territorial Defense Forces (Yugoslavia): (1969-1992)
- Union Defence Force (South Africa): Predecessor to the South African Defence Force (1912-1957)
- United Self-Defense Forces of Colombia: (1997-2008)
- Zanzibar Volunteer Defence Force: (1914-????)

== South Africa ==
In South Africa under apartheid the nominally independent Bantustans had their own forces, separately from the South African Defence Force:

- Bophuthatswana Defence Force: (1977-1994)
- Ciskei Defence Force: (1981-1994)
- Transkei Defence Force: (1981-1994)
- Venda Defence Force: (1979-1994)

== Myanmar Civil War ==
Within the ongoing civil war in Myanmar, several different rebel groups have declared themselves "defense forces":

- People's Defence Force (Myanmar)
- Chinland Defense Force
- Chin National Defence Force
- Karenni Nationalities Defence Force

== Football clubs ==
A number of football clubs related to national militaries are also named such, for example:

- Defence Force F.C., of Trinidad and Tobago
- Barbados Defence Force SC
- Belize Defence Force FC
- Botswana Defence Force XI F.C.
- Guyana Defence Force FC
- Lesotho Defence Force FC

== See also ==
- Chief of the Defence Force (disambiguation)
