= 76th Communications Regiment =

76th Separate Communication and Radio Technical Support Regiment (2020-present) 76th Separate Signal Regiment (2015—2020) 76th Separate Communications and Automated Control Regiment (2000—2015) 76th Separate Signal Regiment (1992—2000)
- 76-й окремий полк зв'язку та радіотехнічного забезпечення
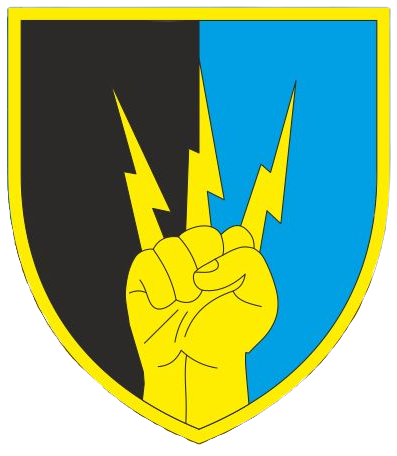
- Insignia of the Ukrainian 76th Communications Regiment
- Active: 1992 – present
- Country: Ukraine
- Allegiance: Ukraine
- Branch: Ukrainian Air Force
- Type: Communication
- Role: Communications
- Part of: Air Command West
- Garrison/HQ: Lviv
- Nickname: "Viacheslav Chornovil" Regiment
- Patron: Viacheslav Chornovil
- Engagements: Russo-Ukrainian war: War in Donbass; 2022 Russian invasion of Ukraine
- Decorations: 96 (Note: For service in WW2)×; 423 (Note: For Service in WW2)×

The 76th Separate Communication and Radio Technical Support Regiment "Viacheslav Chornovil" is a regiment of the Ukrainian Air Force tasked with providing command and communication facilities to the units of Air Command West. It is garrisoned in Lviv.

== History ==
With the declaration of the independence of Ukraine and the Dissolution of the Soviet union, the regiment became a part of the Armed Forces of Ukraine as its personnel swore allegiance to Ukraine in January 1992. After that, the regiment took part in multiple exercises including "Clear Sky", "Peace Shield", "Heavenly Thunder", "Adequate Response". On 30 October 2000, the regiment was returned its award from the Soviet era, after which it became the 76th Separate Order of the Red Banner Communications and Automated Control Regiment of the 14th Air Corps of the Ukrainian Air Force. During the unification of the Ukrainian Air Defence Forces and Ukrainian Air Force, the 53rd Joint Communications Center was merged into the 76th Regiment. The 1st battalion of the regiment, then took part in joint air defense exercises with the Armed Forces of Belarus. In 2011, the regiment took the second place for the best communication units of the Armed Forces of Ukraine. The regiment also took part in such exercises as "Interaction-2012" and "Perspective-2012". In the summer of 2012, during the Euro 2012 held in Ukraine, the regiment carried out operations to protect the airspace of the Lviv Oblast, deploying two auxiliary aviation guidance points near the Arena Lviv. Moreover, the regiment was recognized three times in a row (2010–2012) as the best communications unit of the Ukrainian Air Force. On 9 November 2012, the servicemen of the regiment celebrated the regiment's 70th anniversary. With the formation of the Air Command West in 2014, the regiment became part of it.

On 18 November 2015, the unit was named "76th Separate Signal Regiment" and the Order of the Red Banner was removed in an effort to remove communist influences due to the start of the War in Donbass. On 28 December 2020, the regiment was renamed the 76th Separate Communications and Radio Technical Support Regiment, and it was also given the honorary title "Viacheslav Chornovil".

Following the Russian invasion of Ukraine, it saw action. On 26 March 2024, a soldier of the regiment, Prachek Roman Hryhorovych, was killed in action on the frontlines.

== Commanders ==
- Colonel Ihor Ivanovich Babyniuk (2002–2005)
- Colonel Myroslav Mykolayovych Kurchak (2005–2012)

== Sources ==
Mykhailo Slobodyaniuk, Oleg Feshovets (2015). З'єднання і військові частини сучасних Збройних Сил України в роки Другої світової війни. Lviv: Astrolabia. pp. 199–200, 216. ISBN 978-617-664-067-7.
