= 8th Air Defence Army =

The 8th Separate Army of the Air Defence Forces (Military Unit Number 25342) was a Soviet military formation established in 1960. Army headquarters was in Kiev, Ukrainian SSR.

The 8th air defense army was formed in March 1960 on the basis of the Kiev Air Defense Army on the basis of the Directive of the General Staff of the Air Defense Forces No. omu/1/454690 of 24.03.1960. Previously the Kiev Air Defence Region had air defence responsibility for the area.

In 1980 the Baku Air Defence District was disbanded, and the 12th Air Defence Corps came under the command of the 8th Air Defence Army in April 1980. The 12th Air Defence Corps was shifted under the command of the 19th Air Defence Army in the Caucasus in 1986.

In 1988 it comprised the 49th and 60th Air Defence Corps.

The last commander of the army, General-Lieutenant Mykhailo Lopatin (1989–1992), became the first commander of the Ukrainian Air Defence Forces, and retired as a colonel-general.

== 49th Air Defence Corps, 1988 ==
HQ: Dnepropetrovsk, Dnepropetrovsk Oblast, 3.86 - 6.92

Units of the 49th ADC 1988 (Source Holm)

Regiment	Base	Equipment	Remarks
146th Guards Fighter Aviation Regiment	Vasylkiv (air base)? (Васильков)	MiG-25PD	Taken over by Ukraine 1.6.92. Disbanded 1.6.93. (Holm)
636th Fighter Aviation Regiment	Kramatorsk, Donetsk Oblast	МиГ-23П, Су-15ТМ	1.6.92 taken over by Ukraine. (Holm)
933rd Fighter Aviation Regiment PVO	Kaydaki, Dnepropetrovsk Oblast	MiG-25PD	Taken over by Ukraine 1.6.92. Disbanded 15.5.96.
96th Anti-Aircraft Missile Brigade	Vasilkov, Kiev Oblast		
148th Anti-Aircraft Missile Brigade	Kharkov, Kharkov Oblast		
212th Anti-Aircraft Missile Brigade	Mariupol, Donetsk Oblast		

- 138th Anti-Aircraft Missile Regiment (Dnepropetrovsk, Dnepropetrovsk Oblast)
- 276th Anti-Aircraft Missile Regiment (Svetlovodsk, Kirovograd Oblast)
- 392nd Guards Anti-Aircraft Missile Regiment (Uman, Cherkassy Oblast)
- 613th Anti-Aircraft Missile Regiment (Krivoi Rog, Dnepropetrovsk Oblast)
- 508th Anti-Aircraft Missile Regiment (Donetsk, Donetsk Oblast)
- 317th Anti-Aircraft Missile Regiment (Lugansk, Lugansk Oblast)
- 138th Radio-Technical Brigade (Vasilkov, Kiev Oblast)
- 164th Radio-Technical Brigade (Kharkov, Kharkov Oblast)
- 95th Communications Center (Dnepropetrovsk, Dnepropetrovsk Oblast)

In June 1992 the corps was taken over by Ukraine.

== 60th Air Defence Corps ==
The 60th Air Defence Corps was formed on 15 June 1989 with its headquarters at Odessa, upgraded from the 1st Air Defence Division. It was taken over by Ukraine on 1 June 1992.

Fighter Regiments of the 60th Air Defence Corps

Regiment	Base	Equipment	Remarks
62nd Fighter Aviation Regiment	Belbek	Su-27P	Crimean Oblast
737th Fighter Aviation Regiment	Chervonoglinskoye, Odessa Oblast	MiG-23MLD	Reequipped with MiG-23 in 1981. Arrived from Ayaguz, Semipalatinsk Oblast in October 1989. Taken over by Ukraine 1.1.92. Disbanded 1998. (Holm, )
738th Fighter Aviation Regiment	Zaporoshye-Mokroe, Zaporizhzhia Oblast	MiG-23ML	Formed in August 1941; arrived Zaporizhzhia 1945. Disbanded 9 November 1990.

By 1989, among other units that were part of the corps was the 100th Anti-Aircraft Missile Brigade (Zaporoshye, Zaporoshye Oblast); the 160th Anti-Aircraft Rocket Brigade; the 174th Anti-Aircraft Rocket Brigade (Sevastopol, Crimean Oblast); the 206th Anti-Aircraft Missile Brigade (Yevpatoriya, Crimean Oblast); and the 208th Guards Anti-Aircraft Rocket Brigade (fr:208e_brigade_de_missiles_antiaériens).

The army as a whole was on Ukrainian territory when the Soviet Union dissolved and became the basis for the Ukrainian Air Defence Forces. From January 24, 1992, after the collapse of the USSR, 28th Air Defense Corps, previously subordinate to 2nd Air Defence Army was transferred under the 8th Air Defence Army.

Some units of the army station in the Republic of Moldova were passed onto the Moldovan Armed Forces.
