= Mamchur =

Mamchur (Ukrainian: Мамчур) is a Ukrainian surname. Notable people with the surname include:

- Sergei Mamchur (1972–1997), Ukrainian-Russian footballer
- Yuliy Mamchur (born 1971), Ukrainian colonel
