= Oleh Strutsinskyi =

- Олег Васильович Струцінський
- Born: Oleh Vasylovych Strutsinskyi; Andrushky, Ukraine, Soviet Union
- Military career
- Allegiance: Ukraine
- Rank: Major general
- Conflicts: Russo-Ukrainian War

Oleh Vasylovych Strutsinskyi (Ukrainian: Олег Васильович Струцінський), is a Ukrainian army officer who is the training commander of the Air Force Command of the Armed Forces of Ukraine since 2020.

He was the commander of the Air Command East from 2018 to 2020.

He is a major general as of 2011.

== Biography ==
Oleh Strutsinskyi was born in the village of Andrushki, Zhytomyr Oblast to a family of workers.

In 1987, Strutsinskyi graduated from the Minsk VIZRU of Air Defense.

From 1987 to 2000, he served in the anti-aircraft missile units in the cities of Vasylkiv, Mykolaiv, and Kamianka-Buzka.

From 1995 to 1997, he was a student of the Kharkiv Military Institute of Air Defense.

From 2000 to October 2001, he was the commander of the 1046th anti-aircraft missile regiment in Korosten. From October 2001 to September 2003, Colonel Strutsinsky headed the 540th anti-aircraft missile regiment.

From 2003 to 2006, he was the commander of the 160th anti-aircraft missile brigade. From 2006 to 2008, he served in the military in leadership positions in the Air Command South.

From 2008 to March 2014, he had been the commander of the tactical group "Crimea" of the Air Command South.

On 7 March 2014, during the Russian intervention in Crimea, a message was broadcast that military personnel with weapons and without identification marks (the so-called "green Russian men") forcibly entered the territory of the reserve command post of the Crimea tactical group of the Air Force of the Armed Forces of Ukraine. Major General Strutsinsky, as commander of the group, was at the scene of the events.

Due to jamming of radio signals, information about the location is contradictory - according to one version, he was blocked in a separate house, according to another - he tried to settle the situation through negotiations. He was reported captured on the same day.

According to Major General Strutsinsky, in total, about 400 of his subordinates, including 180 officers, left the Crimean peninsula. On 10 April, 98 servicemen from the Crimea tactical group left Sevastopol on the Sevastopol-Kyiv train.

From 2015 to December 2018, he was the Chief of Staff — First Deputy Commander of the Air Command West.

In December 2018, Strusnikskyi became the commander of Air Command East.

As of 8 December 2020, he is now the training commander of the Air Force Command of the Armed Forces of Ukraine.
