= Stanislav Pavlovych =

- Станіслав Миколайович Павлович
- Born: Stanislav Mykolayovych Pavlovych; 24 January 1954; Antonivka, Ukraine, Soviet Union
- Died: 20 January 2024 (aged 69); Lviv, Ukraine
- Military career
- Allegiance: Soviet Union; Ukraine
- Branch: Soviet Army; Ukrainian Ground Forces
- Service years: 1975-2024
- Rank: Lieutenant General
- Commands: Air Command West
- Conflicts: Soviet-Afghan war

Stanislav Mykolayovych Pavlovych (Ukrainian: Станіслав Миколайович Павлович; 24 January 1954 - 10 January 2024), was a Ukrainian army officer who served as the Commander of the Air Command West from 2008 to 2013. He was last ranked a lieutenant general in 2009.

He was the only general in Ukraine who flew in retirement age. He was awarded with Cavalier of the Order of the Red Star (Soviet Union) and Danila Galitsky (Ukraine). He had been the of the air forces of Ukraine in the Western region.

== Biography ==
Stanislav Pavlovych was born on 21 January 1954 in Antonivka, Mykolaiv Oblast.

In 1975, he graduated from the Chernihiv Higher Military Aviation School of Pilots, later the Sturman Faculty of the Military Air Academy. Y. Gagarin in 1986.

He took a direct part in the war in Afghanistan.

He served in Kyiv, Turkestan, Moscow, Carpathian military districts, GRVN, Western Operational Command in Pilots' positions, aviation commander, deputy commander of the aviation squad combat training (front aircraft) apparatus of the Air Army Combat Training.

He served in the 14th Air Army of the Soviet Union. In 1992, he perjuded the loyalty to Ukraine. Since that time, he worked in the 14th Aviation Corps of the Ukrainian Air Force, which in 2004 was reformatted in the command of the Air Force of Ukraine "West".

He was the commander of the bombard aviation regiment, deputy commander of the bombing aviation division, head of department (organization of flight training)-deputy head of the apparatus Department of Combat Training of the Department of the 14th Aviation Corps of the Air Force of the Armed Forces of Ukraine.

During his service, he advanced from the pilot in the Western Military District to the squadron commander.

In 2004, he was appointed the first deputy commander of the Air Command West.

In January 2008, Pavlovych became the Commander of the Air Command West.

In 2009, he graduated from the National Academy of Defense of Ukraine, and had been promoted to lieutenant general on the 20 August.

As a pilot, he mastered several types of aircraft, among them: L-29, MiG-15, MiG-21, Su-7, Su-17 and Su-24.

After the resignation in 2013, he worked as an instructor prepared pilots.

He died in Lviv on 10 January 2024, and was buried in the 1a Lychakiv Cemetery.
