= Mykhailo Lopatin =

Ukrainian colonel general (1940–2022)

Mykhaylo Oleksiyovych Lopatin
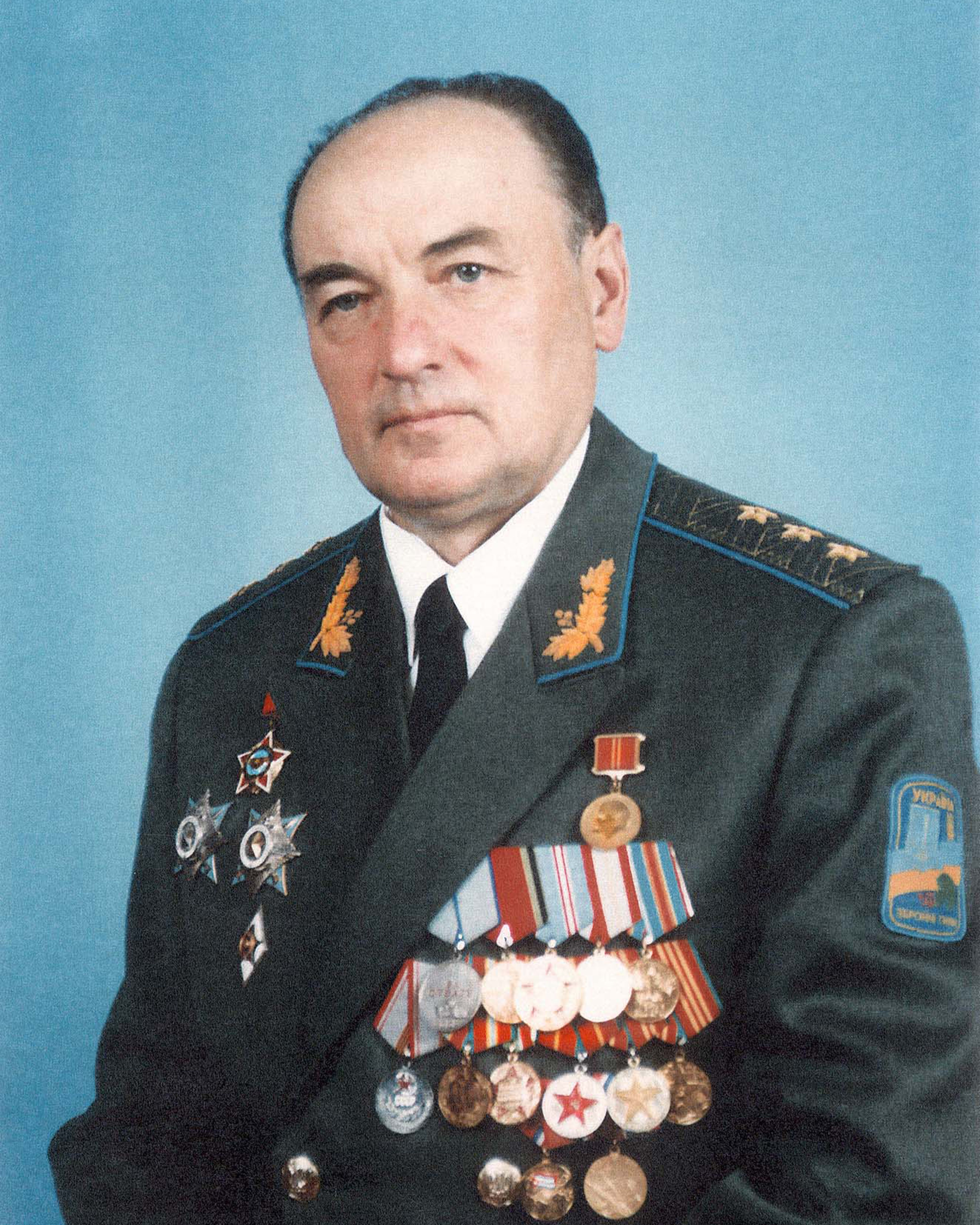
- Born: 1 July 1940; Svoboda, Klichaw, Mogilev Region, Belarusian SSR, Soviet Union (now Belarus)
- Died: 25 April 2022 (aged 81)
- Allegiance: Soviet Union; Ukraine
- Branch: Soviet Air Forces; Ukrainian Air Force
- Service years: 1961–1997
- Rank: Colonel general

Mykhailo Oleksiyovych Lopatin (Ukrainian: Миха́йло Олексі́йович Лопа́тін; 1 July 1940 – 25 April 2022) was a Ukrainian colonel general and scientist who was commander of the Ukrainian Air Defence Forces from 1992 to 1996. Candidate of Military Sciences.

== Early life and education ==
Born on July 1, 1940 in the Mogilev Oblast of Belarus. He graduated from the Daugavpils Military Aviation School in 1961, Minsk Anti-Aircraft Missile Engineering School in 1970, and the Vasilevsky Military Academy of Air Defense of the Ground Forces in 1984 (in absentia).

== Early military career ==
He began his military service in the Dnepropetrovsk Air Defense Brigade as a guidance officer for the S-75 anti-aircraft missile division. In 1962-1965, he carried out a government assignment in Cuba and participated in combat operations. From 1970-1988, he was deputy commander of the S-200 divisional complex, commander of the S-75 divisional complex, chief of staff of the regiment, brigade, commander of the 211th anti-aircraft missile brigade (1976-1978), head of the combat training department of the anti-aircraft missile forces of the army (1978-1982), deputy commander of the air defense corps (1982-1984), commander of the 19th air defense division (1984-1986), commander of the 49th air defense corps (1986-1988). In 1988-1989, he was the chief of staff, and from August 1989 he was the commander of the 8th Air Defence Army. From May 27, 1992, Commander of the Air Defense Forces of Ukraine. From April 1995 to April 1996, he was Commander of the Air Defense Forces of Ukraine. From June to November 1996 - First Deputy Chief of the Academy of the Armed Forces of Ukraine.

== Later life ==
In April 1997 he was dismissed. He died on 25 April 2022.

== Awards ==
- Order "For Service to the Homeland in the Armed Forces of the USSR", 2nd and 3rd class
- Order of Alexander Nevsky
- Medal "For Courage"
- Diploma of Honor of the Minister of the Revolutionary Armed Forces of Cuba,
- Certificate of honor of the Presidium of the Verkhovna Rada of the Ukrainian SSR
- awarded with 14 medals.
