= Borys Henov =

Ukrainian army officer

- Борис Анатолійович Генов
- Born: Borys Anotoliyovych Henov; Soviet Union
- Military career
- Allegiance: Ukraine
- Rank: Major general
- Conflicts: Russo-Ukrainian War

Major general Borys Anotoliyovych Henov (Ukrainian: Борис Анатолійович Генов), is a Ukrainian army officer who served as currently the commander of the Air Command West since 6 August 2023.

== Biography ==
In March 2022, he had been the Chief of Anti-Aircraft Missile Troops — Head of the Department of Training of Anti-Aircraft Missile Troops of the Training Command of the Air Force Command of the Armed Forces of Ukraine.

On 6 August 2023, Henov became the Commander of the Air Command West.
