= Lutsk Air Base =

Ukrainian Air Force base

Lutsk/Lutsk North
- Lutsk, Volyn Oblast in Ukraine
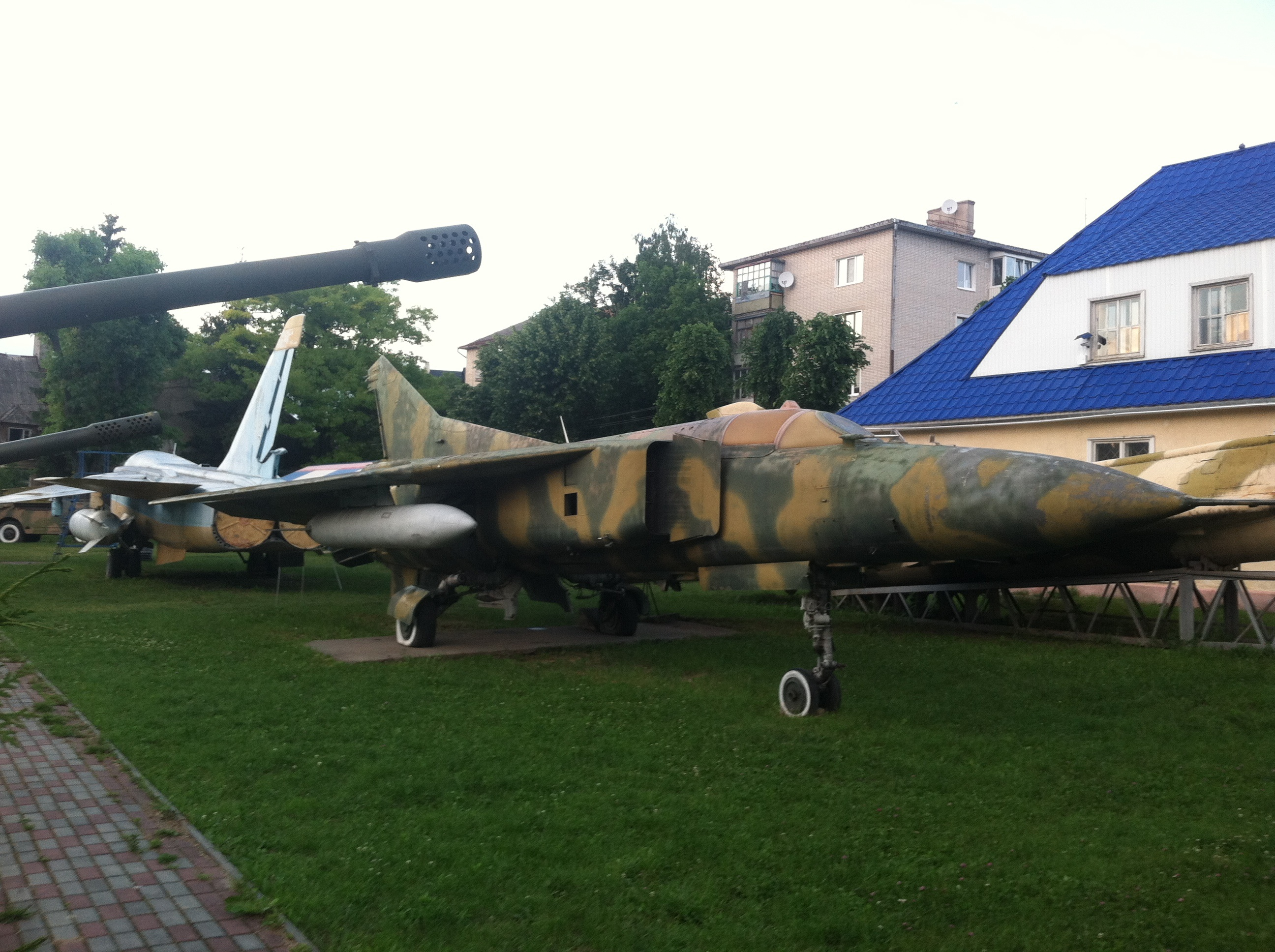
- Lutsk air base in Western Ukraine in June 2013

Site information
- Owner: Ministry of Defence
- Operator: Ukrainian Air Force
- Controlled by: Air Command West

Location
- Shown within Volyn Oblast UKLC (Ukraine)
- Coordinates: 50°47′10″N 025°21′0″E

Site history
- Fate: Destroyed in 2022 (Acc. to Ukrainian officials, disputed)
- Battles/wars: 2022 Russian invasion of Ukraine

Airfield information
- Identifiers: ICAO: UKLC
- Elevation: 195 metres (640 ft) AMSL
Runways
Direction	Length and surface
06/24	2,500 metres (8,202 ft) Concrete

Lutsk (ICAO: UKLC) is an air base of the Ukrainian Air Force located near Lutsk, Volyn Oblast, Ukraine. Previously closed in 2006, the air base was reopened for works in 2014 and since 2018 housed the 204th Tactical Aviation Brigade that currently operates Mikoyan MiG-29M/UB and Aero L-39C Albatross aircraft.

== History ==
It was home to 806th Fighter-Bomber Aviation Regiment (806 APIB) which flew Su-17 aircraft as recently as 1992. It currently serves as storage base for Sukhoi Su-24 bombers. From 1945 to 1992, the regiment was part of the 289th Division of the 57th Air Army, then the 14th Air Army, then the Air Forces of the Carpathian Military District, then the 14th Air Army once more. The airport use was abandoned in 2006. In 2018 it was revived and became the home of the 204th Tactical Aviation Brigade, which was before the 2014 Russian annexation of Crimea based in Belbek Airport.

The base was the target of Russian airstrikes by Russian armed forces on 27 February and 11 March 2022. In the first attack four Su-24 that were stored were destroyed. In the second attack four soldiers died and six more were wounded, while the airbase was completely destroyed, according to the town mayor.

However during 2025, newly acquired Dassault Mirage 2000-5F's were spotted operating from the supposedly destroyed base.
