= Oleksii Marchenko (general) =

Ukrainian military commander (born 1968)

- Олексій Станіславович Марченко
- Born: Oleksii Stanislavovych Marchenko; 1968 (age 57–58); Germany
- Military career
- Allegiance: Ukraine
- Branch: Ukrainian Ground Forces
- Service years: 1993-
- Rank: Major General
- Commands: Air Command West
- Conflicts: Russo-Ukrainian War

Oleksii Stanislavovych Marchenko (Ukrainian: Олексій Станіславович Марченко; born in 1968), is a Ukrainian army officer who served as the commander of the Air Command West from 2016 to 2023.

He previously served as the First Deputy Commanders of the Air Command West from 2015 to 2016.

== Biography ==
Oleksii Marchenko was born in 1968 in Germany into a family of servicemen. Because of his father's service, he and his family lived in different countries, in Poland, and then in Central Asia.

He made his first solo flight on an airplane at the age of 15 on in June 1983. After graduating from high school, he studied at the Kachyna Higher Military Aviation School of Pilots in Volgograd, which he graduated in 1990.

He began his military career in Odesa. At first he was a pilot, then a senior pilot. After taking the oath of loyalty to Ukraine in 1993, in the rank of captain, he continued his service as the head of the paratrooper search and rescue service in the aviation unit near Odesa.

As a member of the Armed Forces, he went from the commander of a unit to the head of air-fire and tactical training (pilot 1st class). He received promotion and assumed the position of squadron commander in the Bratislava Fighter Aviation Regiment (Voznesensk). In 2003, he became the commander of the 204th tactical aviation brigade in Belbek, in Crimea.

Then, in January 2013, he moved to Mykolaiv, where he held the position of head of a specialized combat training center. Later in 2013, he was appointed head of the Center for Combat Training of Aviation Specialists of the Armed Forces of Ukraine. In 2015, Marchenko was the first deputy commander of the Air Command West.

In September 2016, Marchenko became the commander of the Air Command West.

On 30 March 2022, he was awarded a promotion to Major General.

In 2023, he was replaced by his successor, Borys Henov.
