= Air Command West =

Ukrainian Air Force unit

- Повітряне командування «Захід»
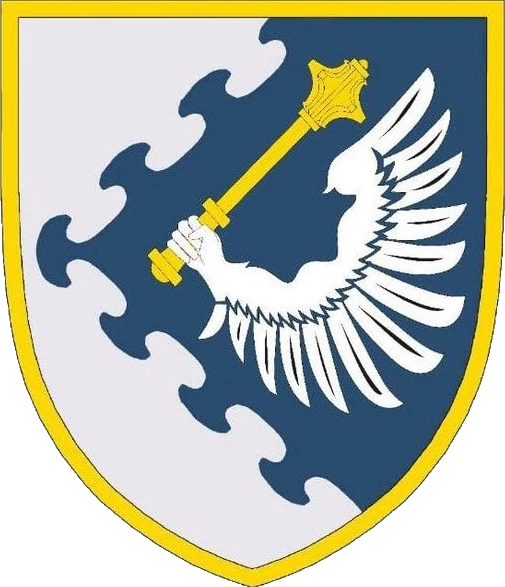
- Active: 2004-present
- Country: Ukraine
- Allegiance: Armed Forces of Ukraine
- Branch: Ukrainian Air Force
- Type: Command
- Garrison/HQ: Lviv
- Website: Official Facebook page

Commanders
- Current commander: Borys Henov

Insignia
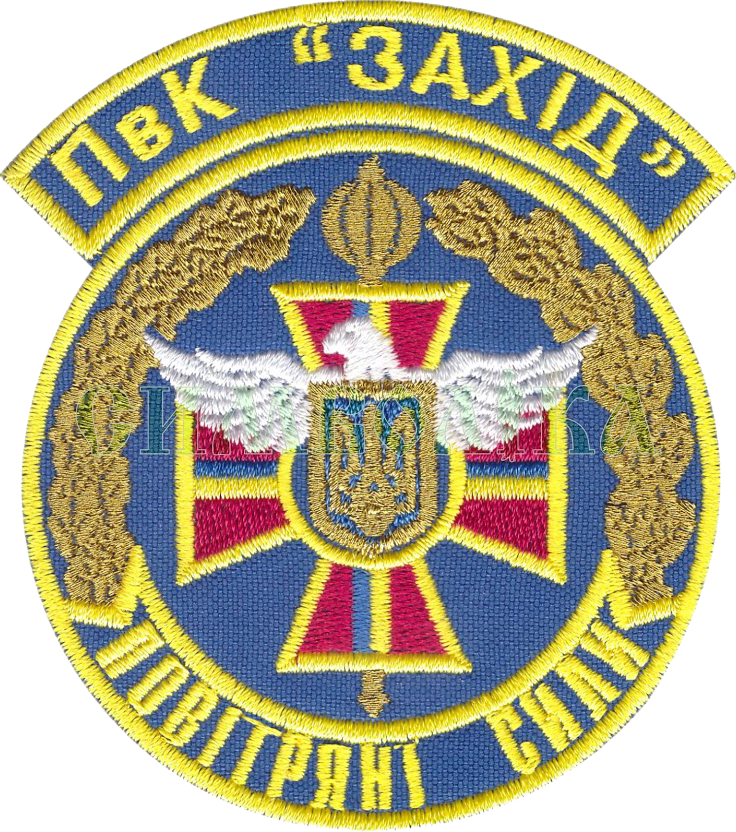
- Shoulder patch

The Air Command "West" (MUN A0780) is the military unit of the Ukrainian Air Force located in the western part of Ukraine.

== History ==
In the course of reforming the Armed Forces of Ukraine in 2004, the Air Command "West" with headquarters in Lviv was created on the funds of the 28th Air Defense Corps and the 14th Aviation Corps.

Its regions contained Volyn Oblast, Zakarpattia Oblast, Ivano-Frankivsk Oblast, Lviv Oblast, Rivne Oblast, Ternopil Oblast, Khmelnytskyi Oblast and Chernivtsi Oblast and is defined by points:

- 51°28'17" N. 27°45'35" E. d.
- 51°23'00" N. 27°45'00" E. d.
- 50°19'41" N. 27°07'41" E. d.
- 50°05'60" N. 27°12'05" E. d.
- 49°45'42" N. 27°51'00" E. d.
- 48°43'31" N. 27°50'26" E. d.
- 48°29'29" N. 27°35'50" E. d.
- Border of Ukraine Ukraine with the Moldova, Romania, Hungary, Slovakia, Poland and Belarus
- 51°28'17" N. 27°45'35" E. d.

The main tasks of the "Zahid" PvK are reliable cover from air strikes of large industrial and economic districts, administrative centers, chemical industry facilities in the Ivano-Frankivsk region, the Rivne and Khmelnytskyi NPPs, as well as important communications and military facilities in the Western, Central and South-Western Ukraine.

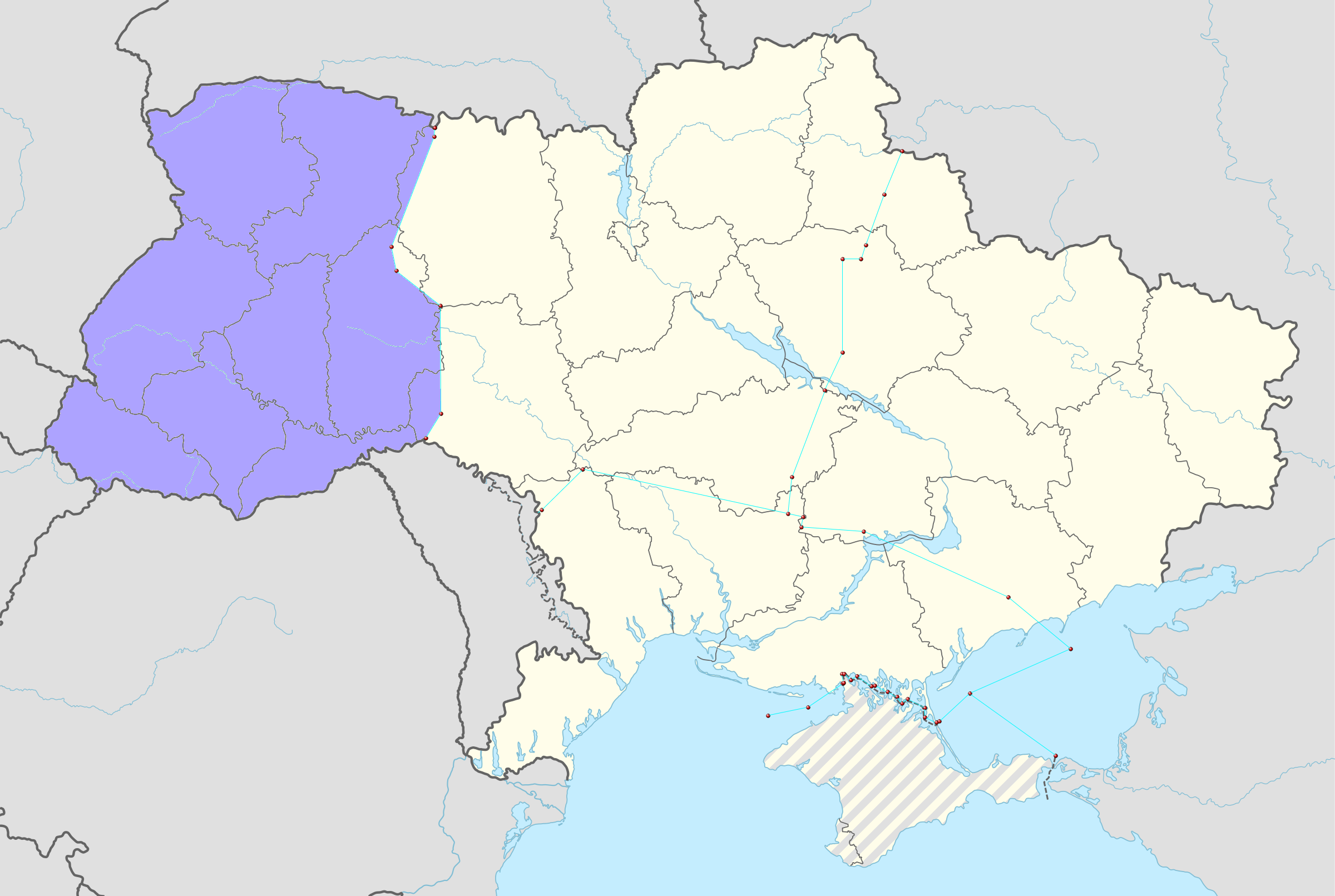
Map of the Air Command West, formally formed in 23 January 2017

== Organization ==
The composition of the Air Command "West" includes:

management (Lviv)

- 76th separate regiment of communication and radio technical support (Lypnyki, Lviv region)
- 1st radio engineering brigade (Lypnyki, Lviv region)
- 114th Tactical Aviation Brigade (Ivano-Frankivsk; MiG-29, L-39)
- 204th Tactical Aviation Brigade (Lutsk; MiG-29, L-39)
- 11th anti-aircraft missile regiment (Shepetivka, Khmelnytskyi region; 9K37 "Buk-M1")
- 223rd anti-aircraft missile regiment (Stry, Lviv region; 9K37 "Buk-M1")
- 540th anti-aircraft missile regiment (Kamyanka-Buzka, Lviv region; S-200, S-300PT)
- 193rd command and control center
- 11th commandant's office of protection and service
- 17th separate battalion of electronic warfare (Kolomiya, Ivano-Frankivsk region)
- 352nd separate engineering and airfield battalion (Khmelnytskyi)
- 8th Aviation Commandant's Office (Lviv)
- 25th Aviation Commandant's Office (Dubno, Rivne Oblast)
- 108th Aviation Commandant's Office (Kolomiya, Ivano-Frankivsk Region; Kolomiya Airfield)
- 202nd aviation range (Povorsk, Volyn region)

== Leadership ==
=== Commanders ===
- Lieutenant General Petro Osypenko (2004–2007)
- Lieutenant General Stanislav Pavlovych (January 2008 – 2013)
- Major General Viacheslav Shamko (2015 – 19 July 2016)
- Major General Oleskiy Marchenko (19 July 2016 – 2023)
- Major General Borys Henov (2023–present)

=== Chiefs of Staff - First Deputy Commanders ===
- Major General Oleh Strutsinskyi (2015 - December 2018)
- Major General Dmytro Karpenko (December 2018 - 2022)

=== First Deputy Commanders ===
- Stanislav Pavlovych (2004 - January 2008)
- Major General Oleskiy Marchenko (2015 - September 2016)

== See also ==
- Air Command Center
- Air Command East
- Air Command South
