= Yuliy Mamchur =

Ukrainian colonel and politician

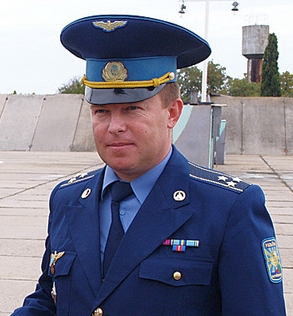

People's Deputy of Ukraine
- In office 27 November 2014 – 24 July 2019

Personal details
- Born: Yuliy Mamchur; 15 August 1971 (age 55) Uman, Cherkasy, Ukrainian SSR
- Party: Petro Poroshenko Bloc
- Spouse: Larysa
- Awards

Military service
- Allegiance: Ukraine
- Branch/service: Ukrainian Air Force
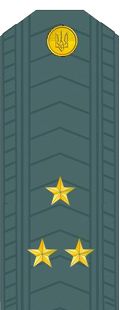
- Rank: Colonel
- Commands: 204th Tactical Aviation Brigade; 62nd Fighter Aviation Regiment
- Battles/wars: Russo-Ukrainian War: Annexation of Crimea by the Russian Federation

Yuliy Valeriyovych Mamchur (Note: Given name may also be transliterated as Yuli, Yuly, or even incorrectly as Yuri, while the family may also be transliterated as Mamtchur or Mamchor) (Ukrainian: Юлій Валерійович Мамчур; born 15 August 1971) is a colonel in the Ukrainian Air Force who, for three weeks in March 2014, refused to abandon his post at the Belbek Air Base, Crimea amidst the annexation of Crimea by the Russian Federation while surrounded and outnumbered by Russian forces. Mamchur is also credited for restraining amiably and diplomatically both his soldiers and pro-Russian forces from escalating tensions further, asking both sides not to shoot at each other while the situation defuses.

Mamchur became a national hero in Ukraine and is considered a hero by Western media outlets. He is known to be calm, stoic and defiant.

In the October 2014 Ukrainian parliamentary elections, Mamchur was elected into the Ukrainian parliament after being in the top 10 of the electoral list of Petro Poroshenko Bloc. He was not re-elected in the 2019 Ukrainian parliamentary election.

== Biography ==
Mamchur graduated in 1991 from the Chernihiv flight school. From then he served 9 years in Zhytomyr before being transferred to Uman. Early 2013 he was appointed commander of the Sevastopol brigade of tactical aviation of the Air Command of the Southern Operational Command.

=== Annexation of Crimea by the Russian Federation ===
On 3 March 2014, Mamchur was given an ultimatum to surrender by Russian forces. He instead chose to march to a pro-Russian checkpoint with his men unarmed while only carrying the flag of the 62nd Fighter Aviation Regiment. The event marked the first time that weapons were fired during the annexation of Crimea by the Russian Federation as Russian troops fired warning shots as Mamchur and his regiment approached. The regiment is well respected amongst Russian troops, including the historic events they went through in 1941. Mamchur and his regiment were stopped at a Russian blockade where he directly confronted the Russian troops by stating that, "It is our duty to safeguard the Constitution of Ukraine in keeping this base." The Russian troops eventually withdrew, while Mamchur, for twenty additional days, maintained his post in Belbek.

Under Col. Mamchur the Belbek base came to be known as a bastion of resistance. Crimean separatists then cut the brakes in the family car, death threats he has received and in Sevastopol posters had been put up demanding his execution for treachery. Mamchur wedded a military couple inside the base. Mamchur has complained that he, and his fellow Ukrainian commanders had received no help from the Ukrainian government despite repeated requests.

On 23 March, Mamchur's base Belbek was overrun by Russian regular troops, being the last Ukrainian base to fall. Mamchur was verbally abused by pro-Russian militia and cossacks, but he refused to be provoked, and ordered his men to resist non-violently and sing the Ukrainian national anthem. Immediately he was then arrested. He was released three days later. According to Mamchur's aides he was being held in Sevastopol. Mamchur has stated he was, during (t)his detention, under intense psychological pressure. "They kept me in a single confinement cell for 3.5 days. On the first day unidentified Russian troops kept constantly talking to me – they tried to persuade me to commit treason, betray the oath to the people of Ukraine, go serve in the Russian army. Then there was just psychological pressure – they would not let me sleep, knocked on the door with gun butts. I feel well, my mood is a fighting one. What will I do next? First, I will take a shower, then I will be making decisions. Glory to Ukraine!".

On 29 March Mamchur and his unit were stationed in Mykolaiv (their wives and children were also re-located in Mykolaiv). In August 2014 Mamchur was "working to restore combat efficiency" of this unit and restaffing it. The unit did receive from Russia about 150 aircraft back (according to Mamchur the ones "which they had discarded as useless"). According to Mamchur "Thirty-eight percent of my subdivision left Crimea, it is slightly more than 200 men".

=== Political career ===
In the 2014 Ukrainian parliamentary election Mamchur was elected into parliament after being in the top 10 of the electoral list of Petro Poroshenko Bloc.

Mamchur was not re-elected in the 2019 Ukrainian parliamentary election. As an independent candidate he failed to win a constituency seat in constituency number 93 situated in Kyiv Oblast. 4.76% of the voters of the constituency voted for Mamchur.

== Awards ==
Order of Bohdan Khmelnytsky 3rd class (21 August 2014).

== Family and personal life ==
Mamchur and his wife, Larysa, lived in Sevastopol. They have one daughter and a granddaughter.
