= Ukrainian Falcons =

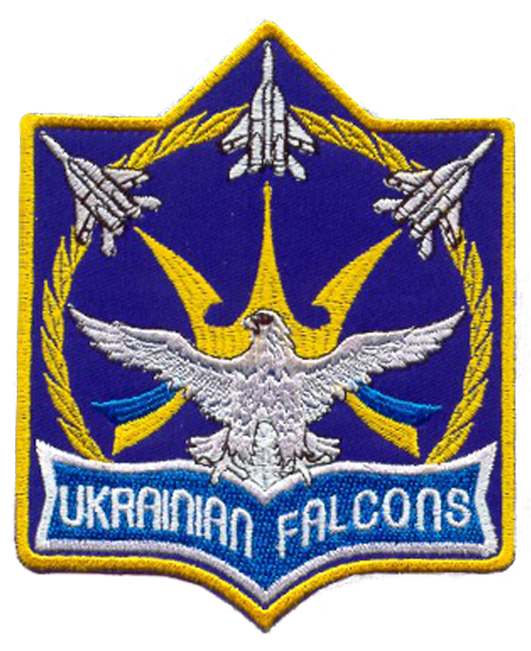
- Logo Ukrainian Falcons
- Active: 1995–2002
- Country: Ukraine
- Branch: Ukrainian Air Force
- Role: Aerobatic flight display team
- Size: Six aircraft
- Colours: White, Yellow, Blue

Aircraft flown
- Fighter: MiG-29

The Ukrainian Falcons (Ukrainian: Українські Соколи, romanized: Ukrayins'ki Sokoly) were the aerobatic demonstration team of the Ukrainian Air Force. It was established in 1995 as a team of six MiG-29 aircraft (five MiG-29 9-13s and one MiG-29UB) and disbanded in 2002.

== History ==
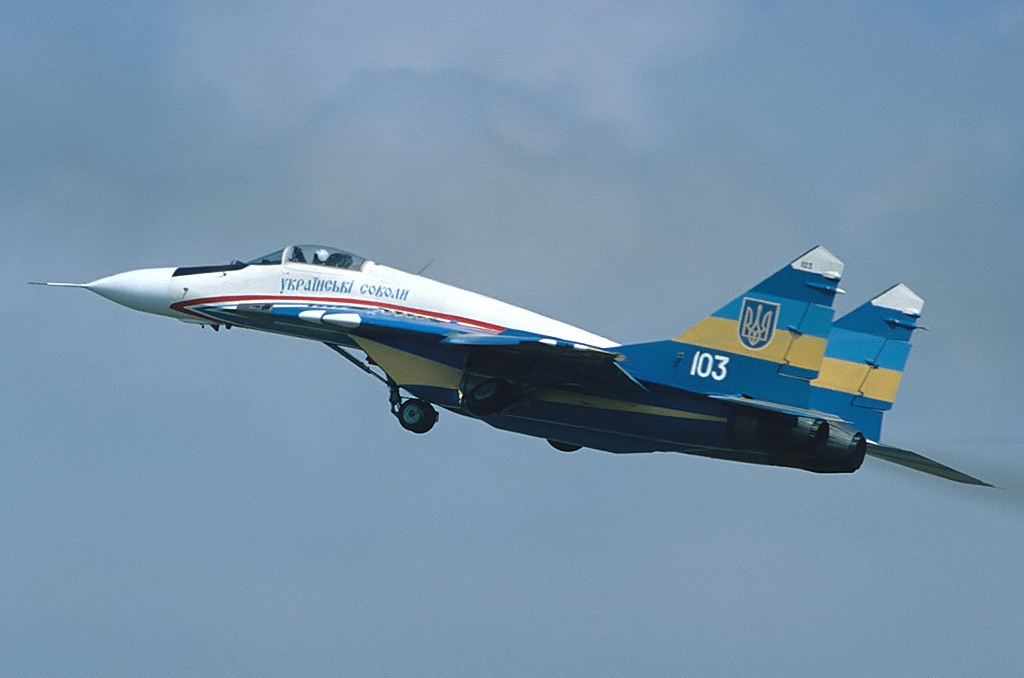
Ukrainian Falcons MiG-29

Dozens of air shows were flown by the team over their existence. These included "The Ukrainian Tridents Tour" in 1992 which had stops in both Canada and the United States. With the team in its infancy, this tour was flown by only two MiG-29s and they were known as the "UkrAF MiG-29 Demonstration Team" at the time. Following the London, Ontario show, an aviation magazine titled their article "Tridents on Tour", stemming from the trident symbol in the Ukrainian Air Force emblem. The team then kept "Ukrainian Tridents" as their unofficial name. A Ukrainian delegation, which included Colonel V. Rososhansky, accompanied the team on tour. Upon seeing displays by the Thunderbirds, the Blue Angels, and the Snowbirds, Colonel Rososhansky decided to create a similar team, and in late 1995 the Ukrainian Falcons were born.

The Ukrainian Falcons represented the elite of the Ukrainian Air Force's fighter pilots. This team was commanded by Colonel Rososhansky (Test Pilot First Class). Other members of the team were Colonels Korolyov and Dudkin, Lieutenant Colonels Kovolyov and Vecherinsky, Majors Sotnikov, Ovchinnikov, and Lieutenant Colonel Nikolay Mekhed. The Falcons were based at the Kirovs'ke Air Base (Kirovs'ke raion, Eastern Crimea). Their international debut as the Ukrainian Falcons was made in 1997 at the Royal International Air Tattoo at RAF Fairford in the United Kingdom. The team would fly together for the last time on October 5, 2001.

Later in 2002, the Ukrainian Falcons were disbanded after Colonel Rososhansky retired from the Air Force. The main reasons for the team's demise include the airshow disaster as well as a poor supply of fuel and spare parts from Ukrainian authorities for regular training flights.

It was suggested by Ukrainian President Victor Yushchenko in 2008 that the team be reformed, and they were in 2011. However, they never flew as an aerobatic team and were again disbanded.

During the initial days of the war in Donbas in April 2014, a MiG-29 formerly belonging to the team was spotted armed with a full air-to-air load and performing a low-altitude flyby over the Donetsk region.

In June 2022, a MiG-29 was seen on video armed with missiles and parked on a runway. With differences from the originals, including in the livery, it is suspected that this aircraft was a Falcons plane, pulled from storage and fixed up with foreign-supplied parts as part of the 2022 Russian invasion of Ukraine.

On 13 October 2022, a MiG-29 wearing a livery similar to the Ukrainian Falcons aircraft was lost on a combat mission in Vinnytsia Oblast while intercepting Iranian Shahed 136 drones used by Russian forces.

== Incidents ==
Ukrainian Falcons member Lt. Col. Volodymyr Toponar was the chief pilot of the Sukhoi Su-27 that crashed during the Sknyliv air show disaster in 2002 (survived with injuries). 77 spectators died in the crash. Toponar was found guilty of causing the crash and was sentenced to 14 years in prison.
