= Valentyn Lystopad =

Ukrainian serviceman

- Native name: Валентин Листопад
- Birth name: Valentyn Antonovych Lystopad
- Born: October 21, 1966 (age 58)
- Allegiance: Ukraine
- Branch: Ukrainian Air Force
- Rank: Major general
- Battles / wars: Russo-Ukrainian War
- Awards: Order of Bohdan Khmelnytsky; Order of Danylo Halytsky

Valentyn Antonovych Lystopad (Ukrainian: Валентин Антонович Листопад) is a Ukrainian serviceman, Major General, Deputy Commander of the Air Force of the Armed Forces of Ukraine.

== Biography ==
Military pilot.

As of September 2021 – Colonel, Commander of the Operational Command of the Air Force of the Armed Forces of Ukraine.

As of February 2022 – Colonel, Deputy Commander of the Air Force of the Armed Forces of Ukraine.

On 7 August 2022, on the day of the Air Force of the Armed Forces of Ukraine, he was promoted to the rank of Major General.

A few days after receiving his next rank, his son (also a military pilot) Anton Lystopad was killed during the full-scale Russian invasion.

== Awards ==
- Order of Bohdan Khmelnytsky, III degree (19 May 2022)
- Order of Danylo Halytsky (2 May 2022)

== Military ranks ==
- Colonel
- Brigadier General (28 February 2022)
- Major General (7 August 2022)
