= Air defence forces =

Military service branch focused on anti-aircraft warfare

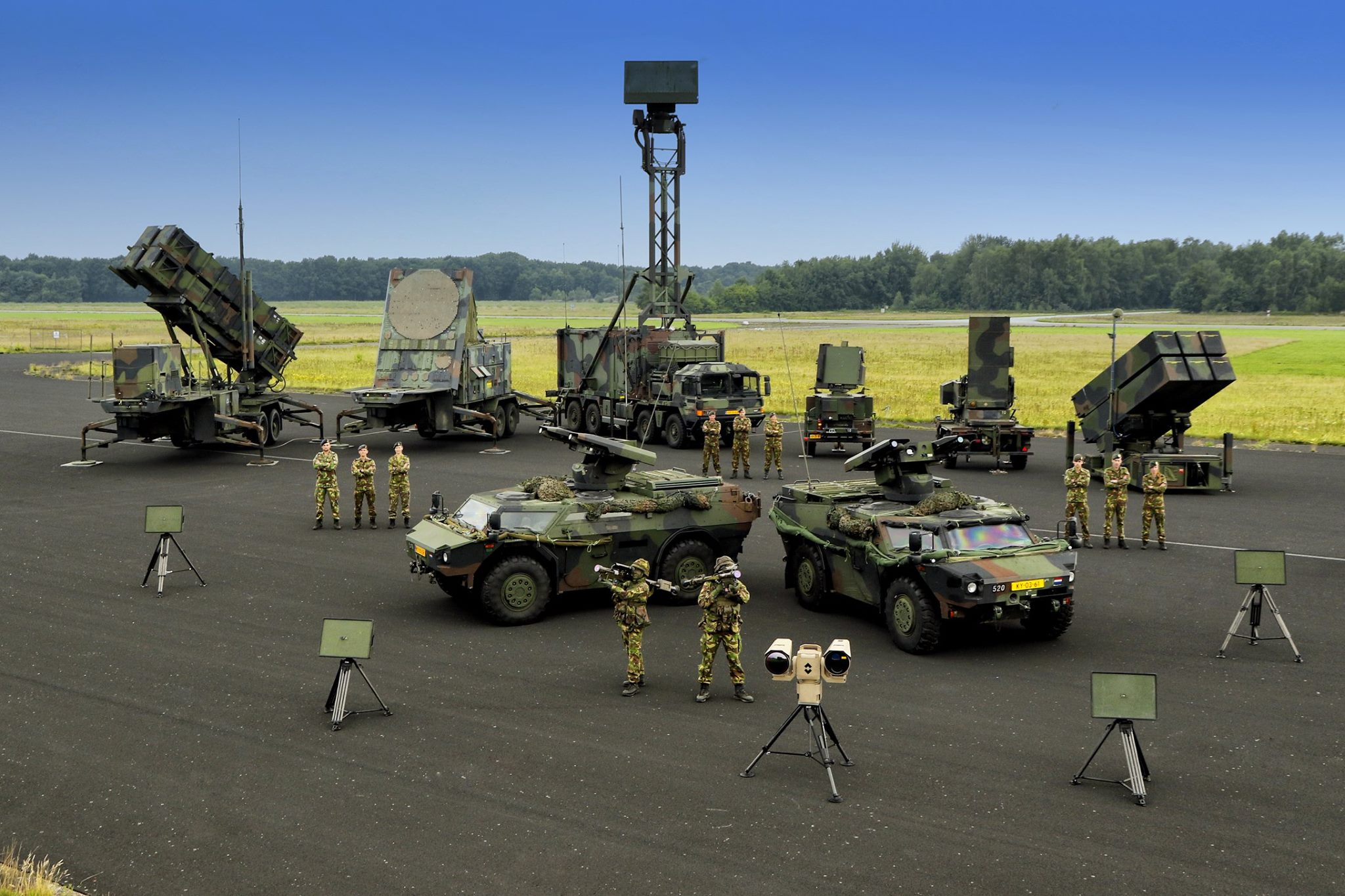
Artist's rendition of short and long range AA systems used by the Dutch Joint Ground-based Air Defence Command

Air defence forces are military forces providing protection from enemy air units and primarily responsible for anti-aircraft warfare.

They can be divided into tactical and strategic. Strategic air defense forces provide generally static defense to static targets (military bases, cities, etc.) while the tactical air defense forces are mobile and provide defense for military forces (usually, ground forces).

== See also ==
- Air Defence Forces (various organizations named as such)
