= 96th Anti-aircraft Missile Brigade =

- 96-та зенітна ракетна бригада
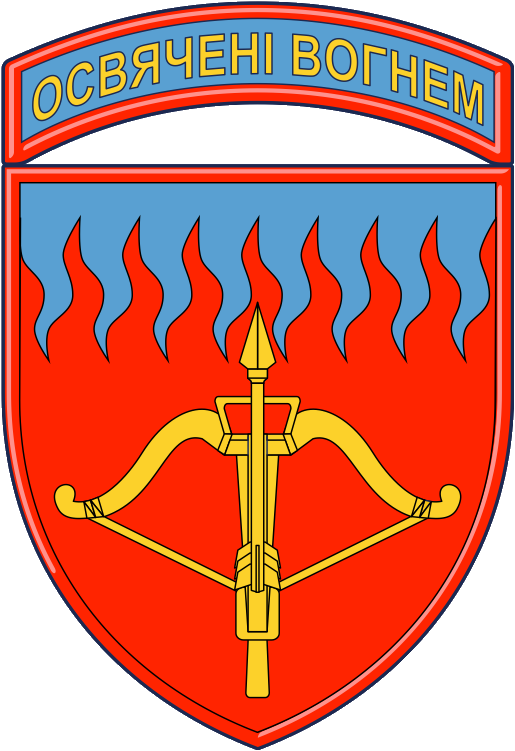
- Active: 1959 – present
- Country: Ukraine; Soviet Union (1959–1991)
- Allegiance: Armed Forces of Ukraine
- Branch: Ukrainian Air Force
- Type: Air Defense Troops
- Role: Air Defense
- Size: Brigade
- Part of: Air Command Center
- Garrison/HQ: Danylivka, Kyiv Oblast
- Nickname: Kyiv Brigade
- Motto: Sanctified by fire
- Anniversaries: April 25
- Equipment: S-300PS and Patriot
- Engagements: Russo-Ukrainian war: War in Donbas; Full scale invasion 2022
- Decorations: For Courage and Bravery

Commanders
- Current commander: Colonel Serhiy Yaremenko Granit

Insignia
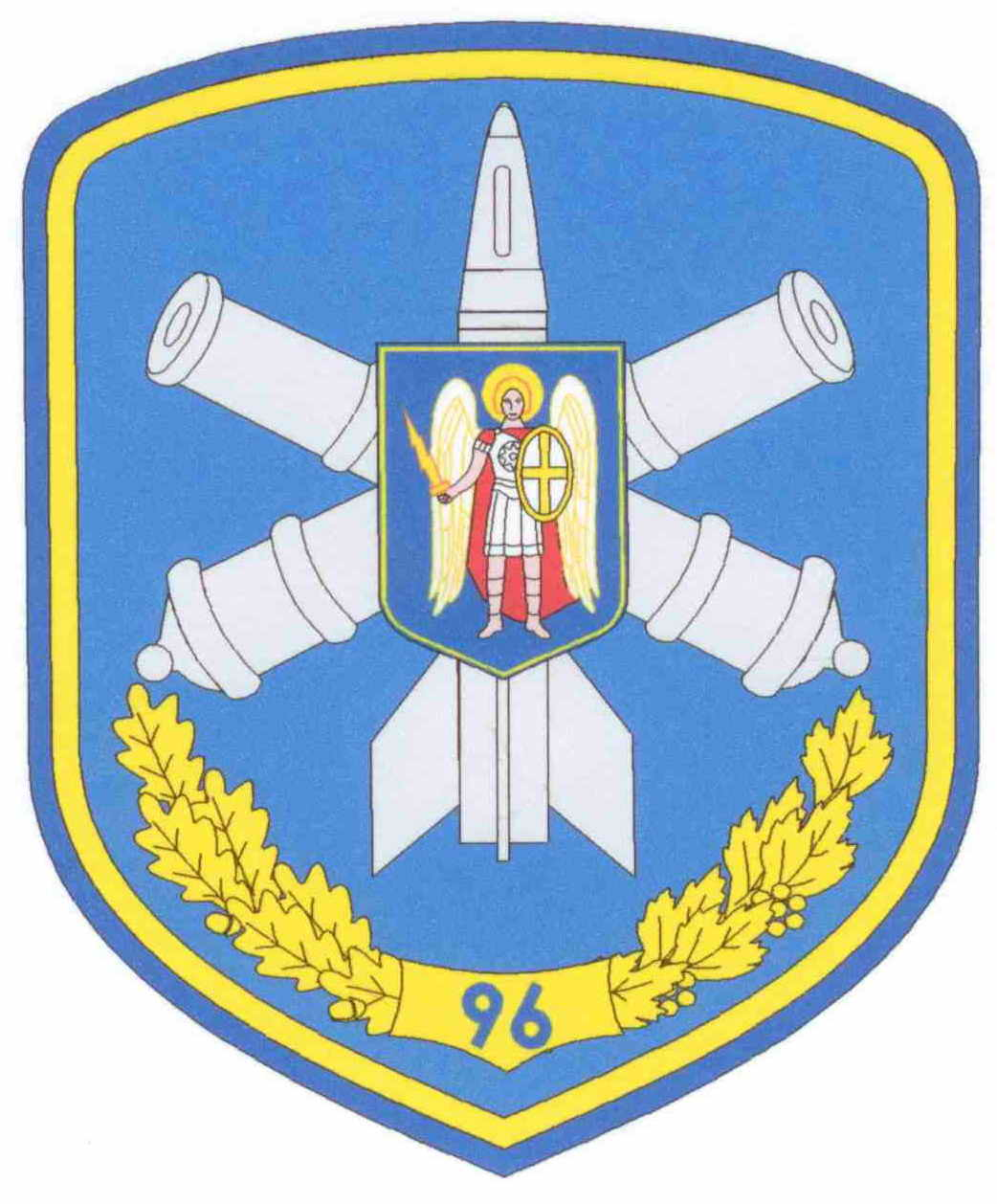
- Former insignia

The 96th Kyiv Anti-aircraft Missile Brigade is a brigade of the Ukrainian Air Force tasked with air defense operations throughout Kyiv Oblast and Chernobyl NPP. It operates S-300PS and Patriot missile defense systems. It is headquartered at Danylivka in Kyiv Oblast.

== History ==
In 1992, the 96th Anti-aircraft Missile Brigade of the Soviet Army came under the jurisdiction of Ukraine, becoming a part of the.Ukrainian Air Force.

On 4 December 1998, the brigade was given the honorary name of "Kyivska".

The 96th Brigade is normally stationed on the territory of Kyiv Oblast and are tasked with the air defense of Kyiv, the Kyiv Hydroelectric Power Plant, and the Chernobyl Nuclear Power Plant.

The brigade's equipment and personnel normally take part in the military parade on the Independence Day of Ukraine.

On the afternoon of 2 February 2016, while patrolling the territory near Spirne, the personnel of the Brigade noticed movement several hundred meters away, they searched but found no one, while returning they blew up a landmine killing two soldiers of the brigade (Samus Gennadiy Vasyliovych and Leonid Eduardovych Kozoroz) and wounding four other soldiers of the brigade.

The brigade engaged Russian troops since 24 February 2022, the day of the start of the Russian invasion of Ukraine with a soldier of the brigade (Viktor Vyacheslavovych Kuzmin) being killed near Svatove on the day one of the invasion. On 15 June 2022, the brigade was awarded the honorary award "For Courage and Bravery".

On 27 June 2023, the brigade's commander Serhii Volodymyrovych Yaremenko was awarded the "Hero of Ukraine", the highest military award for Ukrainian personnel, for the brigade's shooting down of 13 Kh-47M2 Kinzhal hypersonic missiles, according to the Ukrainian Air Force.

== Structure ==
The structure of the brigade is as follows: (pre war)

- 96th Anti-aircraft Missile Brigade
  - 9610th Anti-aircraft Missile Divisions Group:
    - 9611th Anti-aircraft Missile Division (Novi Petrivtsi)
    - 9612th Anti-aircraft Missile Division (Danilivka)
    - 9613th Anti-aircraft Missile Division (Pidhirtsi)
  - 9620th Anti-aircraft Missile Divisions Group:
    - 9621st Anti-aircraft Missile Division (Revne)
    - 9623rd Anti-aircraft Missile Division (Brovary)

== Commanders ==
- Colonel Abrosimov Pavlo Vasyliovych (1992–1994)
- Colonel Volodymyr Leonidovych Izhutov (1994–1999)
- Colonel Viktor Oleksiyovych Machok (1999–2001)
- Colonel Shamko Vyacheslav Evgenovich (2001–2003)
- Colonel Mykola Anatoliyovych Beskutskyi (2003–2006)
- Colonel Serhiy Voznesenskyi (2006–2009)
- Colonel Dobroskok Volodymyr Anatoliyovych (2009–2012)
- Colonel Yuriy Mykolayovych Stavskyi (2012–2016)
- Colonel Vsevolod Georgyovich Bilyk (2016–2019)
- Colonel Serhiy Ivanovych Koval (2019–2020)
- Colonel Oleksiy Oleksiyovych Marakhovsky (2020–2022)
- Colonel Yaremenko Serhii Volodymyrovych (2022-)

== Sources ==
- Військові частини Повітряних Сил за родами військ
