= 223rd Anti-aircraft Missile Regiment =

- 223-й зенітний ракетний полк
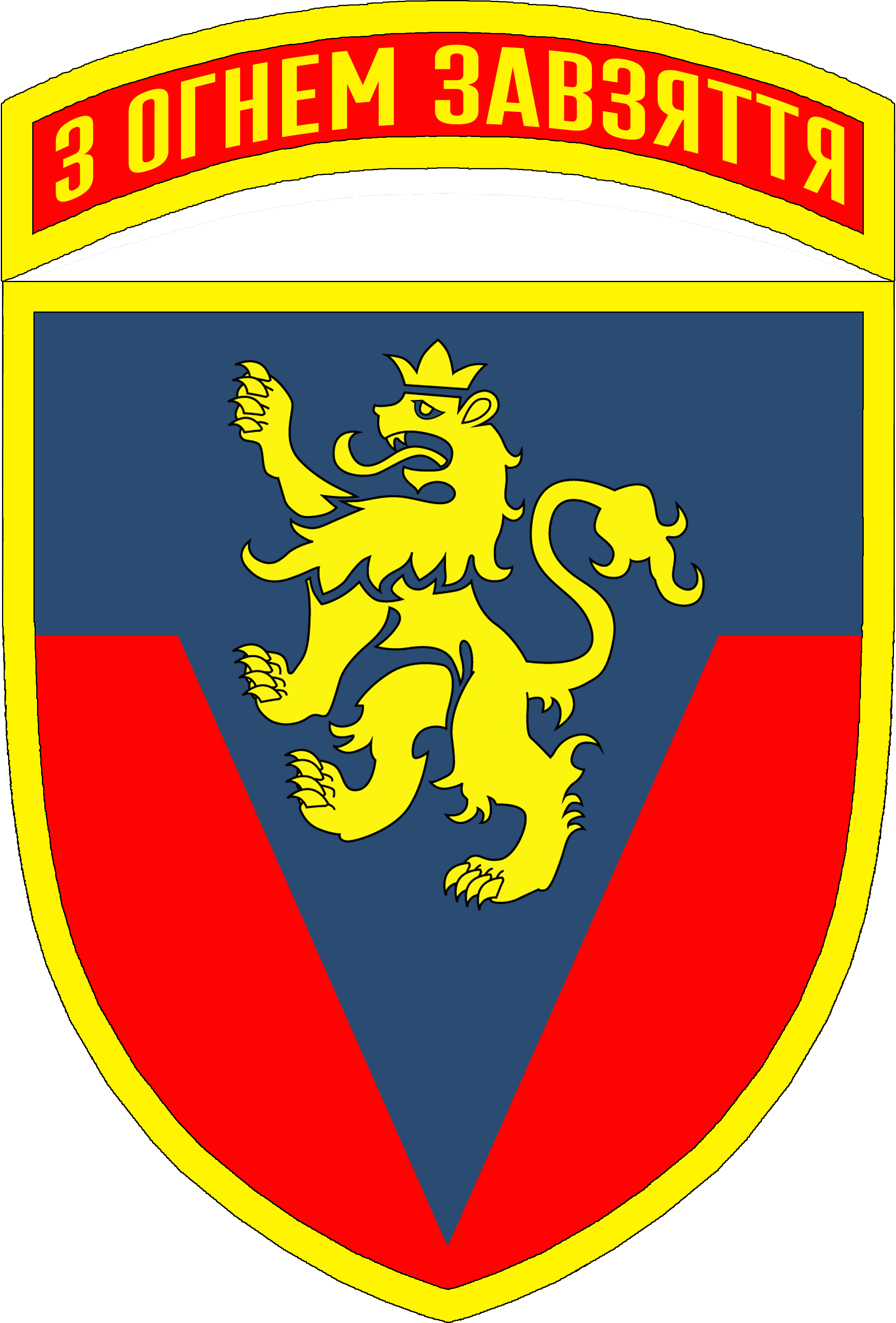
- Active: 1960 – present
- Country: Ukraine; Soviet Union (1960–1991)
- Allegiance: Armed Forces of Ukraine
- Branch: Ukrainian Air Force
- Type: Air Defense Troops
- Role: Air Defense
- Size: Brigade
- Part of: Air Command West
- Garrison/HQ: Stryi, Lviv Oblast
- Nicknames: Ukrainian Sich Riflemen Regiment; Terebovlianska Regiment (formerly)
- Patron: Ukrainian Sich Riflemen
- Motto: With the fire of zeal
- Engagements: Russo-Ukrainian war: War in Donbas; Full scale invasion 2022
- Decorations: For Courage and Bravery; Order of Alexander Nevsky

Commanders
- Current commander: Colonel Ivan Velichko

Insignia
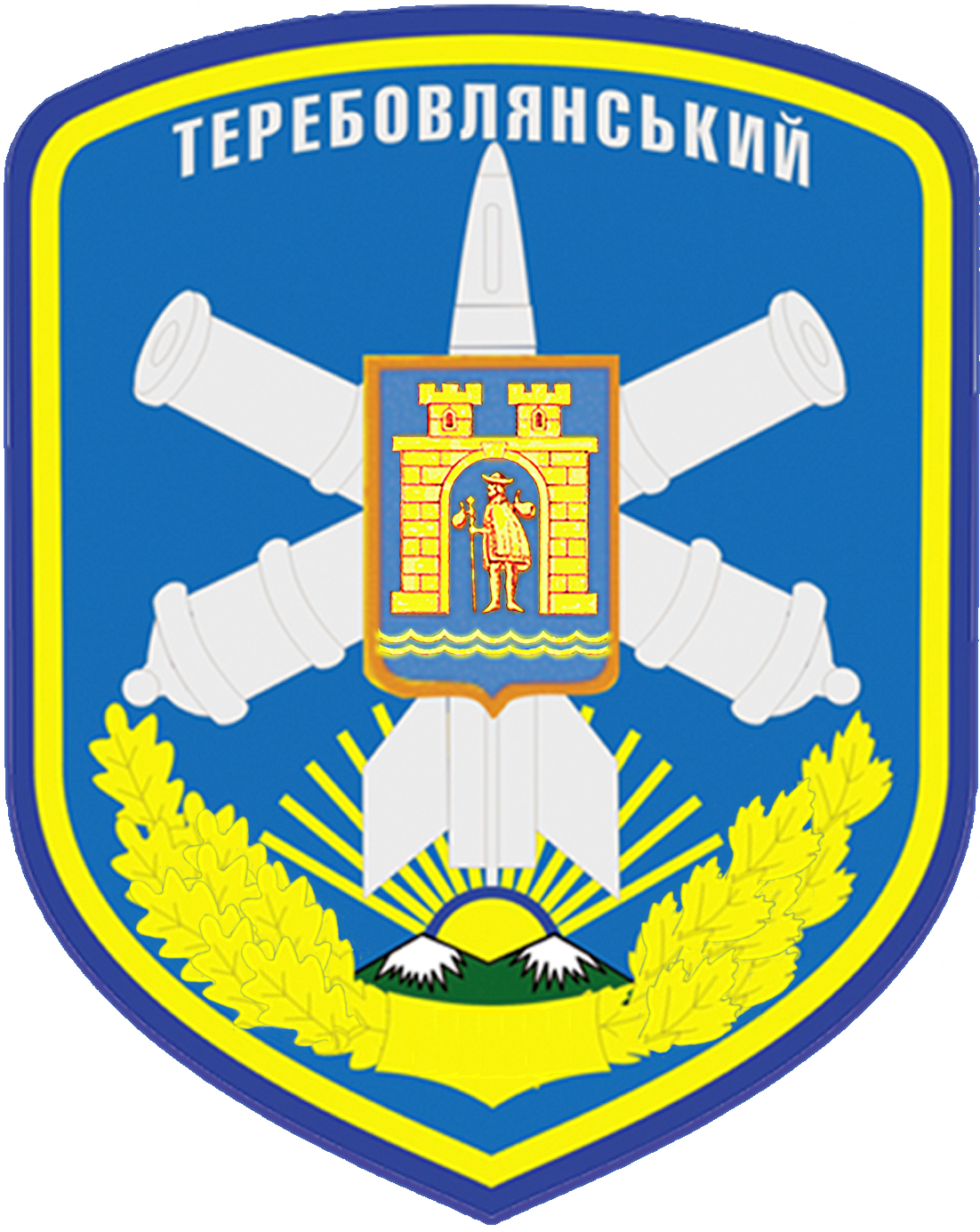
- Former Insignia

The 223rd Anti-aircraft Missile Regiment Ukrainian Sich Riflemen is a regiment of the Ukrainian Air Force tasked with air defense operations. It operates Buk M1 next to several western missile systems and is subordinated to the Air Command West. It is headquartered at Stryi.

== History ==
In January 1992, following the Dissolution of the Soviet union, the personnel of the 223rd Anti-Aircraft Missile Brigade of the 38th Combined Arms Army took an oath of loyalty to Ukraine.

On March 16, 1998, the 223rd brigade was given the honorary name "Terebovlianska".

The 223rd Anti-aircraft Missile Regiment was stationed in Terebovlia, Ternopil Oblast till 2004 when it was relocated to Stryi, Lviv Oblast at the base of the disbanded 25th Anti-aircraft Missile Brigade.

The regiment participated in the War in Donbass. The regiment's personnel saw combat near Hranitne and on 10 October 2018, a soldier of the regiment (Roman Volodymyrovych Magas) was killed as a result of a mine detonation. In November 2018, the 223rd regiment's Buk M1 systems took part in a firing competition in Kherson Oblast with two systems securing the 1st and 2nd places in the competition for which they were awarded 150k and 90k hyrvnias respectively and the regiment was considered the best

On 23 August 2021, the regiment was awarded the honorary title "Ukrainian Sich Riflemen" after the Legion of Ukrainian Sich Riflemen, a unit of the Austro-Hungarian Army that saw combat during the World War I and later the Polish–Ukrainian War as a part of Ukrainian People's Army.

Insignia of the 223rd Anti-aircraft Missile Regiment

During the Russian invasion of Ukraine, the regiment was deployed for combat operations. On 23 April 2022, the regiment was officially granted a new insignia. The regiment took part in the Eastern Ukraine campaign with a soldier of the regiment (Nazar Shved) being killed near Kamainka on 9 May 2022. On 15 June 2022, the regiment was awarded the honorary award "For Courage and Bravery".

The regiment took part in the Battle of Sumy during which on 15 August 15, 2024 a soldier of the regiment (Dmytro Orestovych Yatsyshin) was killed in a Russian rocket attack on the city.

== Structure ==
The structure of the regiment is as follows:

- 553rd Separate Anti-aircraft Missile Division
- 554th Separate Anti-aircraft Missile Division
- 556th Separate Anti-aircraft Missile Division

== Equipment ==
Type	Image	Origin	Function	Number	Note
Surface-to-air missile-Systems
Buk M1		Soviet Union	Self-propelled medium-range surface-to-air missile	?	
Raven		United Kingdom	ASRAAM based mobile anti air vehicle	?	Developed by the UK specifically for Ukraine and delivered in 2023
IRIS-T SLS		Germany	Short range IRIS-T based system	?	Received by Germany from 2023 onward
IRIS-T SLM		Germany	Medium Extended Air Defense System	?	Received by Germany from October 2022 onward
Radars
TRML-4D		Germany	Mobile airspace surveillance radar	?	Received by Germany from 2022 onward

== Commanders ==
- Colonel Serhii Butrymovych (2008–2014)
- Colonel Oleksiy Tsukanov (2014–2018)
- Colonel Velichko Ivan Mykhailovych (2018-)

== Sources ==
- Військова частина Львівщини вважає, що «ордена Олександра Невського» — це почесно
- Військові Стрийського зенітного ракетного полку відзначили 75-річчя з дня формування частини
- Військові частини Повітряних Сил за родами військ
