= Viacheslav Shamko =

Ukrainian Lieutenant General

Hero of Ukraine Viacheslav Shamko
- В'ячеслав Євгенович Шамко
- Born: Viacheslav Yevhenovych Shamko; Soviet Union
- Military career
- Allegiance: Ukraine
- Branch: Soviet Army; Ukrainian Air Force
- Service years: 1984-present
- Rank: Lieutenant General
- Commands: Ukrainian Air Force Chief-of-Staff (2017–); Air Command Center (Deputy Commander) (2006-2012); Air Command West (2015-2016); Air Command South (2016-2017)
- Conflicts: Russo-Ukrainian War

Viacheslav Yevhenovych Shamko (Ukrainian: В'ячеслав Євгенович Шамко) is a Ukrainian military Lieutenant General. Since 2017, Chief of Staff – First Deputy Commander of the Ukrainian Air Force. Participant of the Russian-Ukrainian war, distinguished himself during the Russian invasion of Ukraine in 2022. Hero of Ukraine (2023).

== Biography ==
In 1984, Shamko graduated from the Dnipro Higher Anti-Aircraft Missile Command School of Air Defense. He graduated from Kharkiv Military University in 1999 and the National Defense Academy of Ukraine in 2006.

In 1986, Senior Lieutenant Shamko served in the 540th Anti-Aircraft Missile Regiment (4th S-300 Missile Division). From July 1999 to October 2001, Colonel Shamko was already in charge of this regiment.

From October 2001 to 2003, Viacheslav served as the commander of the 96th Anti-Aircraft Missile Brigade.

In 2012, Deputy Commander of the "Center" Air Command for combat training.

From 2012 to 2014, Chief of Staff and First Deputy Commander of the "West" Military Industrial Complex.

As of 2014, he was the head of the Aviation and Air Defense Center and Deputy Commander of the Aviation and Air Defense Forces of the Operational Command North.

In 2015–2016, Major General Viacheslav Shamko commanded the "West" Air Command.

From July 19, 2016, to summer 2017, Viacheslav Yevhenovych formed the "East" Air Command and was its first commander.

In 2017, Lieutenant General Shamko was appointed Chief of Staff – First Deputy Commander of the Air Force of Ukraine.

On August 6, 2023, President Volodymyr Zelenskyy presented the "Golden Star" Hero of Ukraine to Viacheslav Shamko.

Chairman of the Coordination Council of the journal "Science and Technology of the Air Force of the Armed Forces of Ukraine".

== Ranks ==
- Senior Lieutenant (1986)
- Colonel (1999)
- Major General (December 5, 2014)
- Lieutenant General (August 23, 2017)

== Awards ==
- From August 4, 2023 – Hero of Ukraine
- From April 26, 2022 – Order of Bohdan Khmelnytsky, 3rd Class
- From December 5, 2022 – Order of Bohdan Khmelnytsky, 2nd Class
- From October 11, 2018 – Order of Danylo Halytsky
- From December 3, 2008 – Medal For Military Service to Ukraine

== See also ==
- Ukrainian Air Force
