= Sevastopol International Airport =

Military airfield in Belbek, near Sevastopol, Crimea

Sevastopol International Airport "Belbek" Міжнародний аеропорт Севастополь "Бельбек"
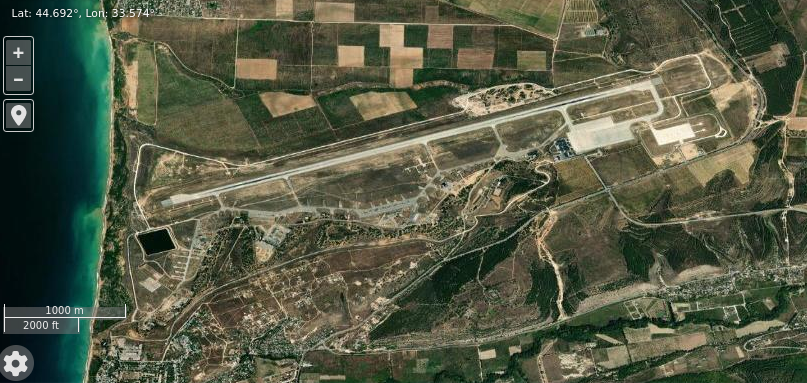
- Satellite imagery of Sevastopol Airport

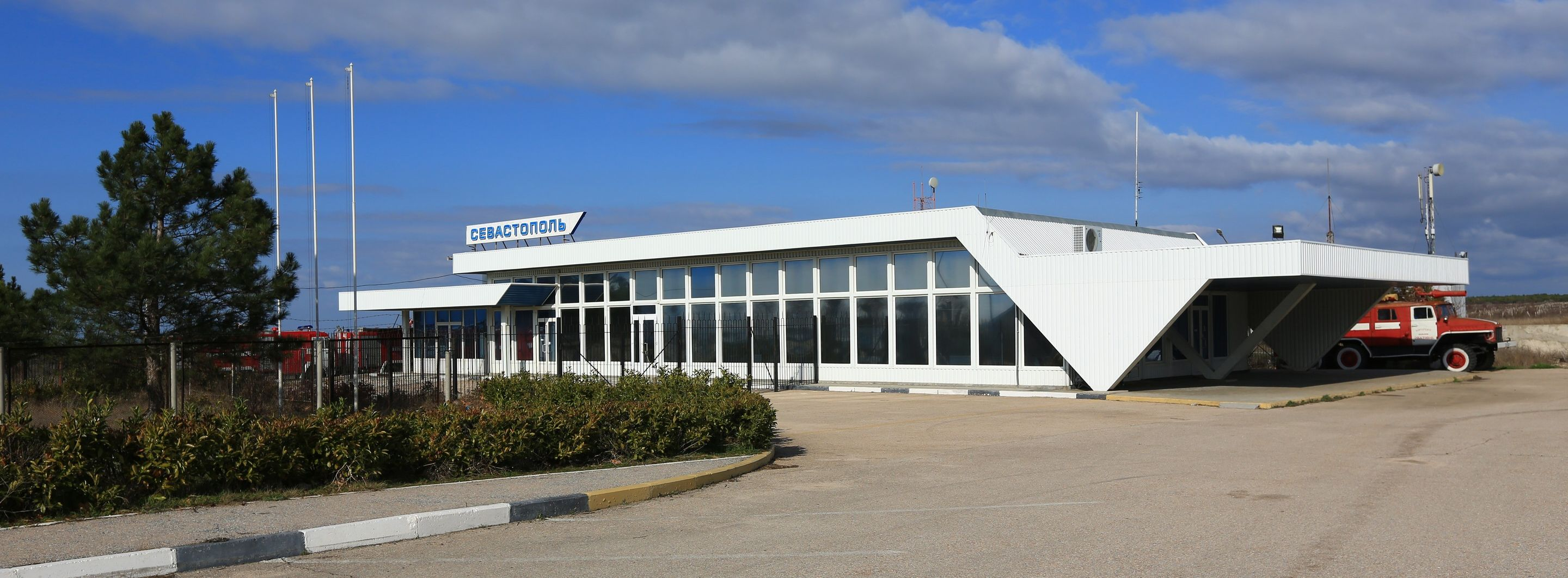
- IATA: UKS; ICAO: UKFB

Summary
- Airport type: Military
- Operator: Russian Air Force
- Location: 9 km (5.6 mi) N of Sevastopol city centre, Crimea
- Built: 1941
- Coordinates: 44°41′31″N 33°34′28″E

Maps
- Location of Sevastopol International Airport within Sevastopol UKFB (Crimea)
- Interactive map of Sevastopol International Airport "Belbek"

Runways
Direction	Length		Surface
Direction	ft	m	Surface
07L/25R	10,337	3,150	Concrete
- Involved in the 2022 Russian invasion of Ukraine

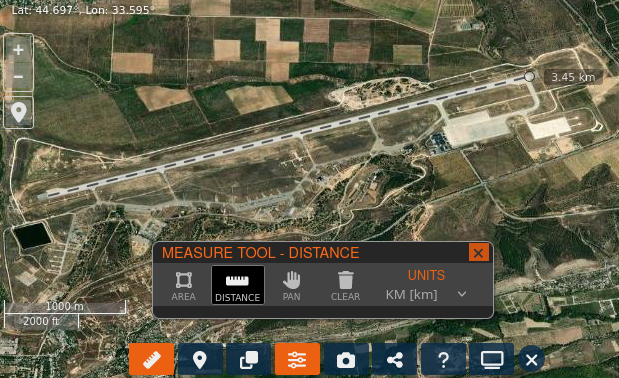
The NASA FIRMS measurement tool shows runway 07L/25R extended to 3.45 km

Sevastopol International Airport Belbek (Note: Crimean Tatar: Belbek Halqara Ava Limanı, Ukrainian: Міжнародний аеропорт Севастополь "Бельбек", romanized: Mizhnarodnyi aeroport Sevastopol "Belbek", Russian: Аэропорт Бельбек) (IATA: UKS, ICAO: UKFB) is a military airfield near the village of Fruktove (formerly known as Belbek), near Sevastopol, Crimea. It was also used for civil aviation for six years from 2002 to 2007 under Ukrainian administration.

Since 2014, following the start of the Russo-Ukrainian War and the annexation of Crimea by the Russian Federation, the base has been operated by the Russian Ministry of Defence. In 2017, plans were published under Russian administration to restore the airfield into an international airport by 2020, but these did not materialize.

The base was home to the 38th Fighter Aviation Regiment, which flies the Sukhoi Su-27 and Sukhoi Su-30 as part of the 27th Composite Aviation Division of the 4th Air and Air Defence Forces Army. After a series of explosions, the unit was withdrawn from the airport at the end of 2022.

NASA's FIRMS imagery shows that runway 07L/25R has been extended to 3.45 km.

== History ==
=== Military airfield since 1941 ===
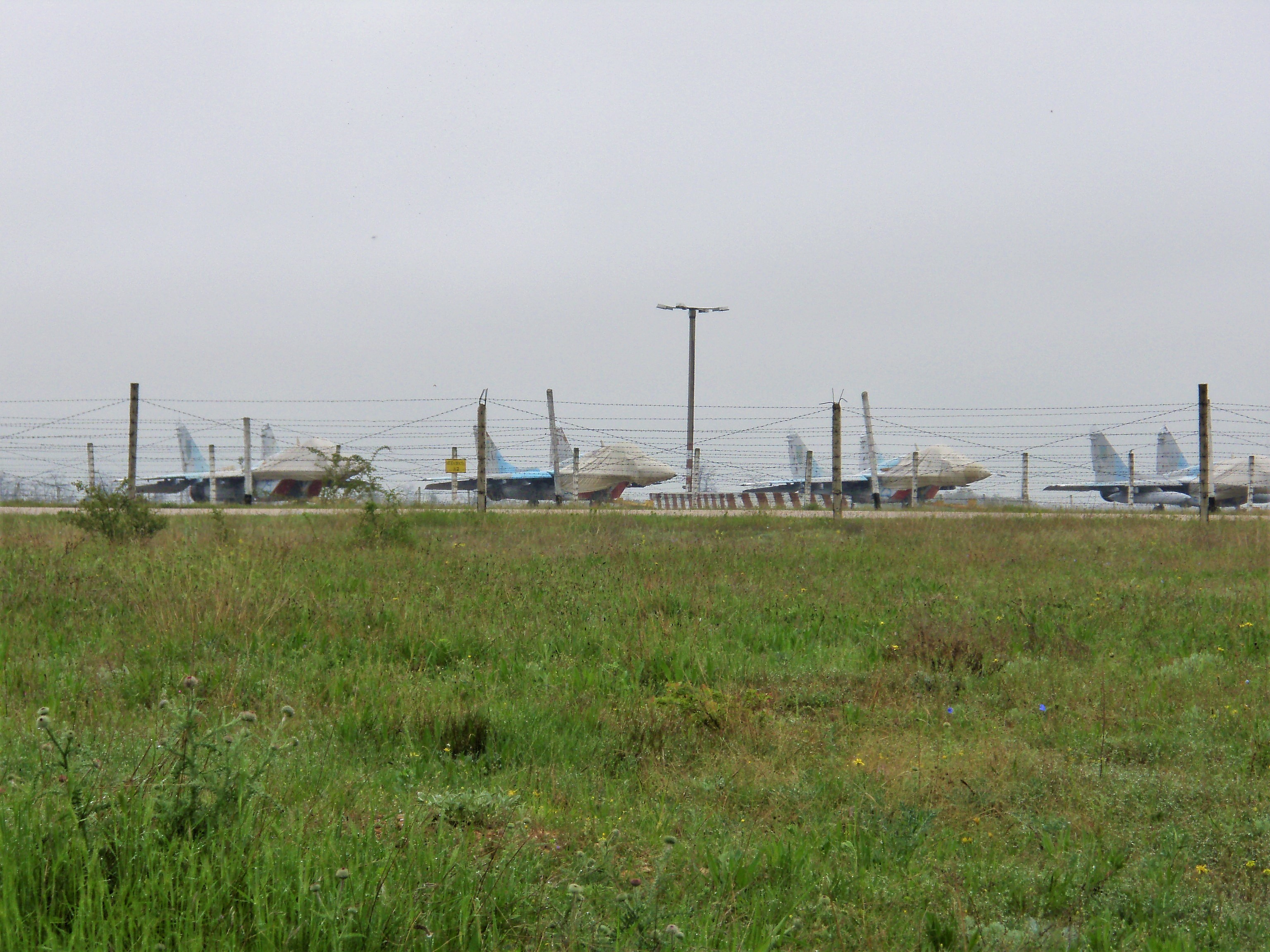
MiG-29s stationed at Belbek

The airfield is located next to the coast, in the Nakhimov District of Sevastopol, north of the city centre, close to the adjacent neighbourhood of Lyubimovka.

The Belbek airfield was built as an operational airfield in 1938; in the summer of that year, the 3rd and 4th aviation squadrons of the 32nd Fighter Aviation Regiment of the Black Sea Fleet Air Force landed on it for the first time in I-15bis aircraft. In the summer of 1939, one squadron of fighters was on duty at the airfield.

In 1940, experiments were conducted on suspending I-16 fighters from TB-3 aircraft, the Zveno project. The TB-3 carrier bomber theoretically delivered the attached I-16 fighters, armed with bombs, to the target. The I-16s acted in this case as dive bombers. Work continued until January 1941. The base airfield of the "SPB link" was the Evpatoria airfield, and the 2nd Squadron of the 32nd IAP, which took part in these experiments, was at that time stationed at Belbek airfield. Also located there were the 3rd Squadron on I-153s and the regiment's command and control unit.

Originally built without a hardened runway, the airfield received a concrete runway after the war.

In 1947, the Black Sea Fleet's 62nd Fighter Aviation Regiment arrived at the base. In 1960, the regiment was transferred from the Soviet Navy to the Soviet Air Defence Forces.

During the second half of the 1980s, after Mikhail Gorbachev came to power, the airfield was significantly expanded and upgraded, as it was to be used by him when travelling to the presidential dacha on the southern coast of Crimea, near Cape Foros. The name of the airport comes from the Belbek River, in the southwest of Crimea.

After Ukrainian independence in 1991, the airfield was under Ukrainian military control, with concurrent use as a civilian airport for a few years.

After Crimea was annexed by Russia in 2014, the Sevastopol transportation authorities stated that Belbek airport was used for civilian charter flights from Ukraine and Russia.

=== 2002–2007: International airport ===
From July 2002, the airfield began to be used for civil aviation. In December 2002, the airport received a licence for international flights. Between 2002 and 2007, over 2,500 flights were carried out, transporting about 25,000 passengers. During 2007, civil flights were suspended again. In spring 2009, it was announced that flights were to resume in the near future, but this did not happen.

Ukrainian military use of the airfield as a fighter airbase continued alongside its civilian use. In 1996, the Su-15TM aircraft based there were replaced by the Su-27, and until 2014 the 204th Tactical Aviation Brigade flying the MiG-29 was based there.

=== Russian military control ===
On 28 February 2014, Ukraine's acting Interior Minister Arsen Avakov stated that the airport had been blocked by Russian Military personnel, and unidentified armed men were patrolling the area. He said via his Twitter account: "I can only describe this as a military invasion and occupation". Neither the Russian Foreign Ministry nor the Russian Defence Ministry responded to requests for comment.

On 11 March 2014, a website was established by military personnel to report directly on current and former events at the airfield. According to the website, there had been a fire at the airfield in the military area (воинская часть, Military Unit Number, А-4515) where electrical equipment was stored, with some unknown soldiers guarding it. The site was updated several times and discontinued in 2016.

On 14 March 2014, Ukrainian Colonel Yuliy Mamchur made an appeal on YouTube to the Ukrainian government, requesting written orders for all Ukrainian troops on the Crimean peninsula. He stated that if he did not receive orders, the 204th Tactical Aviation Brigade would fight, even if facing likely defeat.

The 204th Tactical Aviation Brigade had been deployed in Belbek since December 2007 in military area number A4515 (воинская часть A-4515).

Following the 2014 annexation of Crimea by the Russian Federation, the 38th Fighter Aviation Regiment of the Russian 27th Mixed Aviation Division, flying Su-27s and Su-30s, was established at Belbek, but relocated to Russia after explosions in August 2022.

The 23rd Fighter Aviation Regiment (23 IAP) from Dzyomgi Airport of the Russian Air Force was deployed there from April 2022, flying the Su-35S.

On 1 October 2022, an explosion was reported, which the Russian news agency TASS attributed to an aircraft that ran off the runway while landing, without damaging the airfield.

In January 2017, the company managing the airport presented public plans to open a new temporary terminal with a capacity of 300,000–400,000 passengers by 2018, with a full-size terminal to follow by 2019 or 2020. These plans were not implemented.

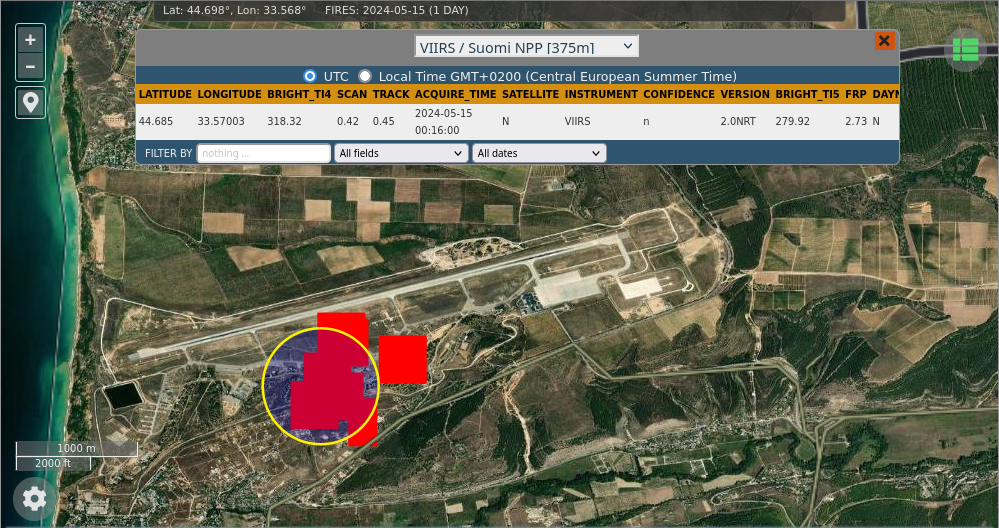
NASA's FIRMS imagery from 15 May 00:16:00 (UTC) showing fires at the airbase

On 15 May 2024, Ukraine launched a missile strike against the airbase, reportedly destroying two MiG-31 fighter jets on the ground, wounding 11 soldiers, and igniting a fire at a fuel and lubricant depot serving the airbase.

On 18 December 2025 Ukraine claimed it had struck the airport the previous night and released video stills appearing to show that it had destroyed a MiG-31, a Pantsir-S2 air defence system, Nebo-SVU radar system and a radar associated with the s-400 air defence system. Video from local residents was consistent with some kind of attack taking place.

== Airlines and destinations ==
As of 2015, there were no scheduled flights to or from the airport.

== See also ==
- List of the busiest airports in the former Soviet Union
- Simferopol International Airport
- List of military airbases in Russia
