= Markovo, Russia =

Markovo (Russian: Марково) is the name of several rural localities in Russia.

== Amur Oblast ==
As of 2010, one rural locality in Amur Oblast bears this name:

- Markovo, Amur Oblast, a selo in Markovsky Rural Settlement of Blagoveshchensky District

== Chelyabinsk Oblast ==
As of 2010, one rural locality in Chelyabinsk Oblast bears this name:

- Markovo, Chelyabinsk Oblast, a village in Khutorsky Selsoviet of Uvelsky District

== Chukotka Autonomous Okrug ==
As of 2010, one rural locality in Chukotka Autonomous Okrug bears this name:

- Markovo, Chukotka Autonomous Okrug, a selo in Anadyrsky District

== Irkutsk Oblast ==
As of 2010, one rural locality in Irkutsk Oblast bears this name:

- Markovo, Irkutsk Oblast, a selo in Ust-Kutsky District

== Ivanovo Oblast ==
As of 2010, four rural localities in Ivanovo Oblast bear this name:

- Markovo, Gavrilovo-Posadsky District, Ivanovo Oblast, a village in Gavrilovo-Posadsky District
- Markovo, Komsomolsky District, Ivanovo Oblast, a selo in Komsomolsky District
- Markovo, Shuysky District, Ivanovo Oblast, a village in Shuysky District
- Markovo, Verkhnelandekhovsky District, Ivanovo Oblast, a village in Verkhnelandekhovsky District

== Kaluga Oblast ==
As of 2010, two rural localities in Kaluga Oblast bear this name:

- Markovo, Baryatinsky District, Kaluga Oblast, a village in Baryatinsky District
- Markovo, Spas-Demensky District, Kaluga Oblast, a village in Spas-Demensky District

== Kirov Oblast ==
As of 2010, two rural localities in Kirov Oblast bear this name:

- Markovo, Nemsky District, Kirov Oblast, a selo in Markovsky Rural Okrug of Nemsky District
- Markovo, Yaransky District, Kirov Oblast, a village in Opytnopolsky Rural Okrug of Yaransky District

== Kostroma Oblast ==
As of 2010, six rural localities in Kostroma Oblast bear this name:

- Markovo, Chukhlomsky District, Kostroma Oblast, a village in Sudayskoye Settlement of Chukhlomsky District
- Markovo, Galichsky District, Kostroma Oblast, a village in Dmitriyevskoye Settlement of Galichsky District
- Markovo, Ostrovsky District, Kostroma Oblast, a village in Adishchevskoye Settlement of Ostrovsky District
- Markovo, Soligalichsky District, Kostroma Oblast, a village in Burdukovskoye Settlement of Soligalichsky District
- Markovo, Belkovskoye Settlement, Vokhomsky District, Kostroma Oblast, a village in Belkovskoye Settlement of Vokhomsky District
- Markovo, Petretsovskoye Settlement, Vokhomsky District, Kostroma Oblast, a village in Petretsovskoye Settlement of Vokhomsky District

== Kurgan Oblast ==
As of 2010, two rural localities in Kurgan Oblast bear this name:

- Markovo, Markovsky Selsoviet, Ketovsky District, Kurgan Oblast, a selo in Markovsky Selsoviet of Ketovsky District
- Markovo, Svetlopolyansky Selsoviet, Ketovsky District, Kurgan Oblast, a station in Svetlopolyansky Selsoviet of Ketovsky District

== Kursk Oblast ==
As of 2010, one rural locality in Kursk Oblast bears this name:

- Markovo, Kursk Oblast, a selo in Markovsky Selsoviet of Glushkovsky District

== Leningrad Oblast ==
As of 2010, two rural localities in Leningrad Oblast bear this name:

- Markovo, Tikhvinsky District, Leningrad Oblast, a village in Tsvylevskoye Settlement Municipal Formation of Tikhvinsky District
- Markovo, Volosovsky District, Leningrad Oblast, a village in Begunitskoye Settlement Municipal Formation of Volosovsky District

== Lipetsk Oblast ==
As of 2010, one rural locality in Lipetsk Oblast bears this name:

- Markovo, Lipetsk Oblast, a village in Domovinsky Selsoviet of Izmalkovsky District

== Mari El Republic ==
As of 2010, one rural locality in the Mari El Republic bears this name:

- Markovo, Mari El Republic, a village in Markovsky Rural Okrug of Orshansky District

== Moscow Oblast ==
As of 2010, five rural localities in Moscow Oblast bear this name:

- Markovo, Osheykinskoye Rural Settlement, Lotoshinsky District, Moscow Oblast, a village in Osheykinskoye Rural Settlement of Lotoshinsky District
- Markovo, Lotoshino, a village under the administrative jurisdiction of the urban settlement of Lotoshino, Lotoshinsky District
- Markovo, Ozyorsky District, Moscow Oblast, a village in Boyarkinskoye Rural Settlement of Ozyorsky District
- Markovo, Ramensky District, Moscow Oblast, a selo in Kuznetsovskoye Rural Settlement of Ramensky District
- Markovo, Ruzsky District, Moscow Oblast, a village in Kolyubakinskoye Rural Settlement of Ruzsky District

== Nizhny Novgorod Oblast ==
As of 2010, six rural localities in Nizhny Novgorod Oblast bear this name:

- Markovo, Bor, Nizhny Novgorod Oblast, a village in Redkinsky Selsoviet of the city of oblast significance of Bor
- Markovo, Semyonov, Nizhny Novgorod Oblast, a village in Ivanovsky Selsoviet of the city of oblast significance of Semyonov
- Markovo, Gorodetsky District, Nizhny Novgorod Oblast, a village in Zinyakovsky Selsoviet of Gorodetsky District
- Markovo, Koverninsky District, Nizhny Novgorod Oblast, a village in Bolshemostovsky Selsoviet of Koverninsky District
- Markovo, Tonshayevsky District, Nizhny Novgorod Oblast, a village in Oshminsky Selsoviet of Tonshayevsky District
- Markovo, Voskresensky District, Nizhny Novgorod Oblast, a village in Nestiarsky Selsoviet of Voskresensky District

== Novgorod Oblast ==
As of 2010, six rural localities in Novgorod Oblast bear this name:

- Markovo, Borovichsky District, Novgorod Oblast, a village in Zhelezkovskoye Settlement of Borovichsky District
- Markovo, Demyansky District, Novgorod Oblast, a village in Ilyinogorskoye Settlement of Demyansky District
- Markovo, Novgorodsky District, Novgorod Oblast, a village in Novoselitskoye Settlement of Novgorodsky District
- Markovo, Poddorsky District, Novgorod Oblast, a village in Belebelkovskoye Settlement of Poddorsky District
- Markovo, Starorussky District, Novgorod Oblast, a village in Velikoselskoye Settlement of Starorussky District
- Markovo, Valdaysky District, Novgorod Oblast, a village in Yedrovskoye Settlement of Valdaysky District

== Novosibirsk Oblast ==
As of 2010, one rural locality in Novosibirsk Oblast bears this name:

- Markovo, Novosibirsk Oblast, a village in Kuybyshevsky District

== Perm Krai ==
As of 2010, two rural localities in Perm Krai bear this name:

- Markovo, Chaykovsky, Perm Krai, a village under the administrative jurisdiction of the city of krai significance of Chaykovsky
- Markovo, Beryozovsky District, Perm Krai, a village in Beryozovsky District

== Primorsky Krai ==
As of 2010, one rural locality in Primorsky Krai bears this name:

- Markovo, Primorsky Krai, a selo under the administrative jurisdiction of the city under krai jurisdiction of Lesozavodsk

== Pskov Oblast ==
As of 2010, twelve rural localities in Pskov Oblast bear this name:

- Markovo, Dedovichsky District, Pskov Oblast, a village in Dedovichsky District
- Markovo, Loknyansky District, Pskov Oblast, a village in Loknyansky District
- Markovo, Novorzhevsky District, Pskov Oblast, a village in Novorzhevsky District
- Markovo, Novosokolnichesky District, Pskov Oblast, a village in Novosokolnichesky District
- Markovo, Opochetsky District, Pskov Oblast, a village in Opochetsky District
- Markovo (Berezhanskaya Rural Settlement), Ostrovsky District, Pskov Oblast, a village in Ostrovsky District; municipally, a part of Berezhanskaya Rural Settlement of that district
- Markovo (Berezhanskaya Rural Settlement), Ostrovsky District, Pskov Oblast, a village in Ostrovsky District; municipally, a part of Berezhanskaya Rural Settlement of that district
- Markovo (Gorodishchenskaya Rural Settlement), Ostrovsky District, Pskov Oblast, a village in Ostrovsky District; municipally, a part of Gorodishchenskaya Rural Settlement of that district
- Markovo, Palkinsky District, Pskov Oblast, a village in Palkinsky District
- Markovo, Pechorsky District, Pskov Oblast, a village in Pechorsky District
- Markovo, Pustoshkinsky District, Pskov Oblast, a village in Pustoshkinsky District
- Markovo, Velikoluksky District, Pskov Oblast, a village in Velikoluksky District

== Ryazan Oblast ==
As of 2010, one rural locality in Ryazan Oblast bears this name:

- Markovo, Ryazan Oblast, a village in Markovsky Rural Okrug of Rybnovsky District

== Samara Oblast ==
As of 2010, one rural locality in Samara Oblast bears this name:

- Markovo, Samara Oblast, a selo in Kinel-Cherkassky District

== Smolensk Oblast ==
As of 2010, five rural localities in Smolensk Oblast bear this name:

- Markovo, Dorogobuzhsky District, Smolensk Oblast, a village in Usvyatskoye Rural Settlement of Dorogobuzhsky District
- Markovo, Dukhovshchinsky District, Smolensk Oblast, a village in Bulgakovskoye Rural Settlement of Dukhovshchinsky District
- Markovo, Krasninsky District, Smolensk Oblast, a village in Neykovskoye Rural Settlement of Krasninsky District
- Markovo, Kapustinskoye Rural Settlement, Novoduginsky District, Smolensk Oblast, a village in Kapustinskoye Rural Settlement of Novoduginsky District
- Markovo, Vysokovskoye Rural Settlement, Novoduginsky District, Smolensk Oblast, a village in Vysokovskoye Rural Settlement of Novoduginsky District

== Tver Oblast ==
As of 2010, eleven rural localities in Tver Oblast bear this name:

- Markovo, Bezhetsky District, Tver Oblast, a village in Bezhetsky District
- Markovo, Kalininsky District, Tver Oblast, a village in Kalininsky District
- Markovo, Kalyazinsky District, Tver Oblast, a village in Kalyazinsky District
- Markovo (Shepelevskoye Rural Settlement), Kashinsky District, Tver Oblast, a village in Kashinsky District; municipally, a part of Shepelevskoye Rural Settlement of that district
- Markovo (Davydovskoye Rural Settlement), Kashinsky District, Tver Oblast, a village in Kashinsky District; municipally, a part of Davydovskoye Rural Settlement of that district
- Markovo, Kimrsky District, Tver Oblast, a village in Kimrsky District
- Markovo (Stanskoye Rural Settlement), Likhoslavlsky District, Tver Oblast, a village in Likhoslavlsky District; municipally, a part of Stanskoye Rural Settlement of that district
- Markovo (Veskinskoye Rural Settlement), Likhoslavlsky District, Tver Oblast, a village in Likhoslavlsky District; municipally, a part of Veskinskoye Rural Settlement of that district
- Markovo, Molokovsky District, Tver Oblast, a village in Molokovsky District
- Markovo, Sonkovsky District, Tver Oblast, a village in Sonkovsky District
- Markovo, Zubtsovsky District, Tver Oblast, a village in Zubtsovsky District

== Tyumen Oblast ==
As of 2010, one rural locality in Tyumen Oblast bears this name:

- Markovo, Tyumen Oblast, a selo in Zavodoukovsky District

== Udmurt Republic ==
As of 2010, two rural localities in the Udmurt Republic bear this name:

- Markovo, Debyossky District, Udmurt Republic, a village in Uyvaysky Selsoviet of Debyossky District
- Markovo, Syumsinsky District, Udmurt Republic, a village in Vaskinsky Selsoviet of Syumsinsky District

== Vladimir Oblast ==
As of 2010, four rural localities in Vladimir Oblast bear this name:

- Markovo, Kolchuginsky District, Vladimir Oblast, a village in Kolchuginsky District
- Markovo (village), Petushinsky District, Vladimir Oblast, a village in Petushinsky District
- Markovo (selo), Petushinsky District, Vladimir Oblast, a selo in Petushinsky District
- Markovo, Yuryev-Polsky District, Vladimir Oblast, a village in Yuryev-Polsky District

== Vologda Oblast ==
As of 2010, ten rural localities in Vologda Oblast bear this name:

- Markovo, Babayevsky District, Vologda Oblast, a village in Kuysky natsionalny vepssky Selsoviet of Babayevsky District
- Markovo, Bechevinsky Selsoviet, Belozersky District, Vologda Oblast, a village in Bechevinsky Selsoviet of Belozersky District
- Markovo, Kunostsky Selsoviet, Belozersky District, Vologda Oblast, a village in Kunostsky Selsoviet of Belozersky District
- Markovo, Mezhdurechensky District, Vologda Oblast, a village in Botanovsky Selsoviet of Mezhdurechensky District
- Markovo, Nikolsky District, Vologda Oblast, a village in Niginsky Selsoviet of Nikolsky District
- Markovo, Syamzhensky District, Vologda Oblast, a village in Rezhsky Selsoviet of Syamzhensky District
- Markovo, Vashkinsky District, Vologda Oblast, a village in Andreyevsky Selsoviet of Vashkinsky District
- Markovo, Leskovsky Selsoviet, Vologodsky District, Vologda Oblast, a village in Leskovsky Selsoviet of Vologodsky District
- Markovo, Markovsky Selsoviet, Vologodsky District, Vologda Oblast, a village in Markovsky Selsoviet of Vologodsky District
- Markovo, Vytegorsky District, Vologda Oblast, a village in Devyatinsky Selsoviet of Vytegorsky District

== Yaroslavl Oblast ==
As of 2010, ten rural localities in Yaroslavl Oblast bear this name:

- Markovo, Chudinovsky Rural Okrug, Bolsheselsky District, Yaroslavl Oblast, a village in Chudinovsky Rural Okrug of Bolsheselsky District
- Markovo, Markovsky Rural Okrug, Bolsheselsky District, Yaroslavl Oblast, a village in Markovsky Rural Okrug of Bolsheselsky District
- Markovo, Borisoglebsky District, Yaroslavl Oblast, a selo in Ramensky Rural Okrug of Borisoglebsky District
- Markovo, Babayevsky Rural Okrug, Danilovsky District, Yaroslavl Oblast, a village in Babayevsky Rural Okrug of Danilovsky District
- Markovo, Semivragovsky Rural Okrug, Danilovsky District, Yaroslavl Oblast, a village in Semivragovsky Rural Okrug of Danilovsky District
- Markovo, Semlovsky Rural Okrug, Danilovsky District, Yaroslavl Oblast, a village in Semlovsky Rural Okrug of Danilovsky District
- Markovo, Trofimovsky Rural Okrug, Danilovsky District, Yaroslavl Oblast, a village in Trofimovsky Rural Okrug of Danilovsky District
- Markovo, Nekouzsky District, Yaroslavl Oblast, a village in Rozhalovsky Rural Okrug of Nekouzsky District
- Markovo, Rostovsky District, Yaroslavl Oblast, a selo in Savinsky Rural Okrug of Rostovsky District
- Markovo, Tutayevsky District, Yaroslavl Oblast, a village in Rodionovsky Rural Okrug of Tutayevsky District
