= General Dynamics F-16 Fighting Falcon operational history =

The F-16 Fighting Falcon was manufactured from General Dynamics from 1974 to 1993, Lockheed Corporation from 1993 to 1995, and since 1995, it has been manufactured by Lockheed Martin. Over 4,500 F-16s have been sold. The new versions from the Lockheed Martin F-16V Viper family under production by the Lockheed Martin at its new production facility.

== United States ==
The F-16 is in service with United States Air Force active, reserve, and Air National Guard units, and is used by the USAF aerial demonstration team, the U.S. Air Force Thunderbirds, and as an adversary/aggressor aircraft by the United States Navy.

=== Operation Desert Storm (1991) ===
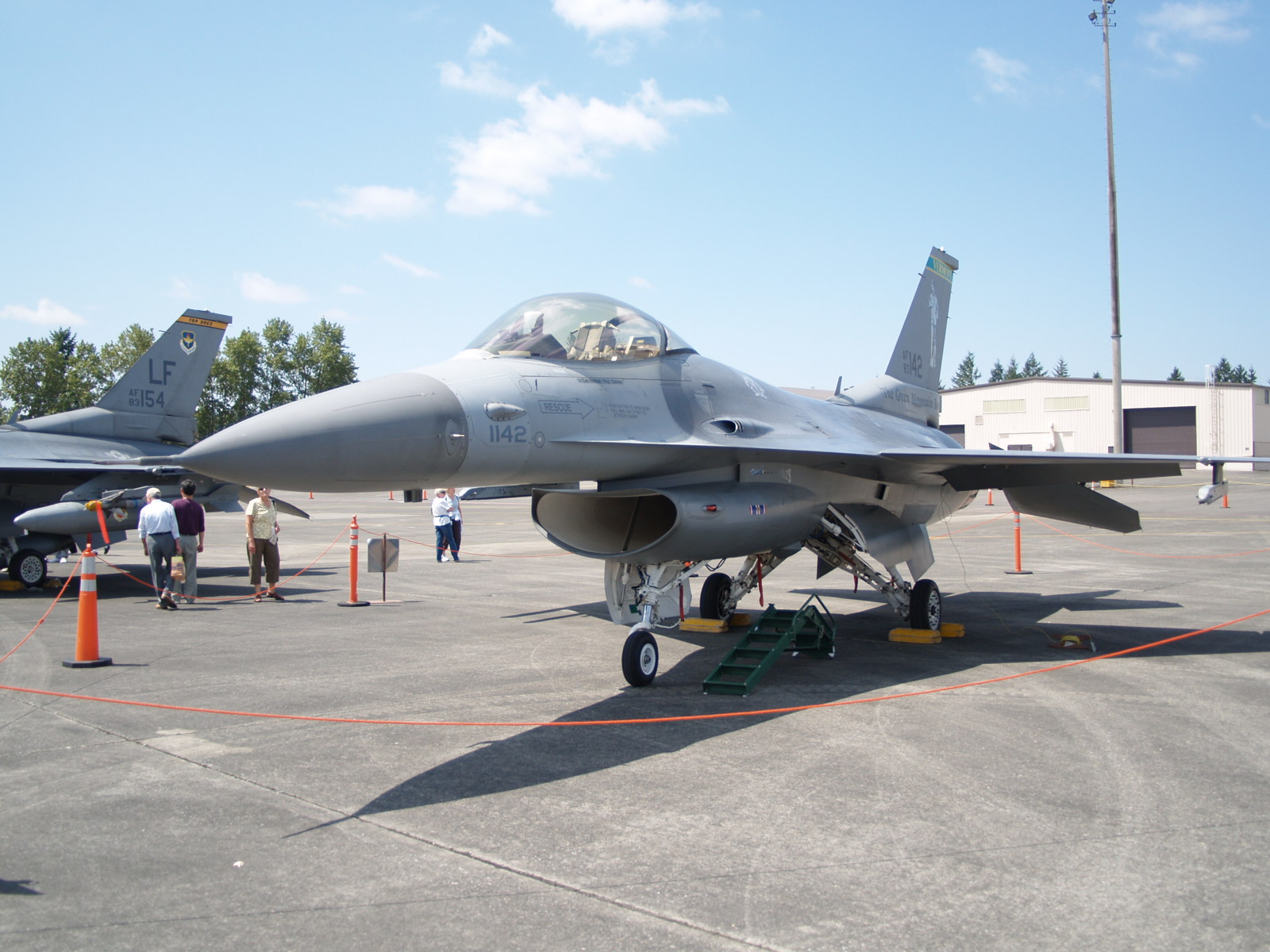
A F-16C of the Vermont Air National Guard on the hardstand at McChord AFB, Washington.

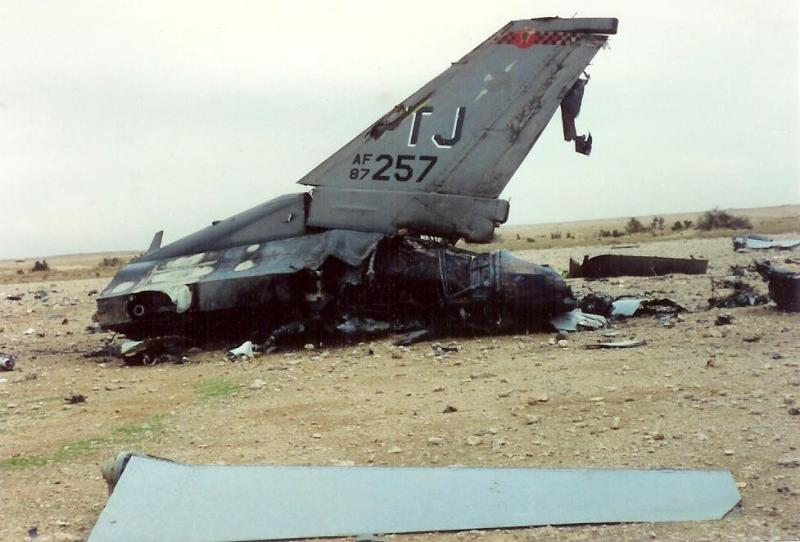
Remains of F-16C #87-0257 from the 614th Tactical Fighter Squadron 'Lucky Devils', shot down over Iraq during Operation Desert Storm.

In Operation Desert Storm of 1991, 249 USAF F-16s flew 13,340 sorties in strikes against Iraq, the most of any Coalition aircraft. Falcons often had AGM-65s (up to six), or two Mk84 2,000 lb bombs (middle underwing pylons), two 1,400 L fuel tanks, two AIM-9 and an underbelly ECM pod, such as the AN/ALQ-131. F-16Ds from the 388th Tactical Fighter Wing at Hill AFB were used as spotter aircraft to search and find Iraqi SAMs and Republican Guard troops. They were armed with up to six Mk82s, Cluster Bombs, and LGBs. These aircraft were also equipped with LANTIRN and binoculars. Three aircraft were lost to confirmed enemy action: two to enemy radar guided SA-6 and SA-3 surface-to-air missiles (SAMs) and one to a shoulder-launched SA-16 missile. Other F-16s were damaged in accidents and by hostile ground fire but were able to return to base and be repaired. In all, seven F-16 were lost during Desert Storm combat operations between January 16 and February 28.

F-16s formed the basis of the largest strike package (72 aircraft) flown during the war – "Package Q", a daylight raid against targets in downtown Baghdad on 19 January. It was during the "Package Q" mission that two F-16s, from 614th TFS 'Lucky Devils', part of the 401st TFW (P), flying from Doha, Qatar were lost to SAMs with their pilots (Capt Mike "Cujo" Roberts and Maj 'Tico' Tice downed, respectively, by a SA-2 and SA-3) becoming POWs. This mission also marked the largest single operational F-16 strike package flown to date.

F-16s were used also as Wild Weasel shooters, with AGM-88 HARM missiles, together with older F-4Gs (480th TFS, 52nd Wing). There were only 13 F-16s with HARMs, all based at Incirlik Air Base, together with 12 F-4Gs. Phantoms had the powerful AN/APR-47 and with these systems, they did the more difficult tasks (attacking the mobile radar sites); F-16s were only recently fitted with HARMs, and the bulk of USAF SEAD was still the F-4G (another 48 were at Sheik Isa, Bahrain). F-16s flew escort/Wild Weasel missions escorting them and striking pre-planned targets. The 138th Fighter Squadron (174th TFW, New York ANG) used 24 F/A-16s equipped with a 30 mm gunpod, the GPU-5/A 'Pave Claw', a four-barreled derivative of the A-10 Thunderbolt's GAU-8 Avenger, but this proved a failure owing to excess vibration and inadequate gunsights.

=== Interwar Air Operations over Iraq (1991–2003) ===
From the end of Desert Storm until the invasion of Iraq in 2003, USAF F-16s patrolled the US/UK imposed no-fly zones in Iraq. Two air-to-air victories were scored by USAF F-16s in Operation Southern Watch. On 27 December 1992, a USAF F-16D shot down an Iraqi MiG-25 in the airspace over southern Iraq with an AIM-120 AMRAAM; this was the first USAF F-16 kill since the F-16 was introduced; and was also the first AMRAAM kill. On 17 January 1993, a USAF F-16C destroyed an Iraqi MiG-23 with an AMRAAM missile for the second USAF F-16 victory.

F-16s returned to Iraq in December 1998 as part of the Operation Desert Fox bombing campaign to "degrade" Iraq's ability to manufacture and use weapons of mass destruction.

=== Balkans (1994–1995 and 1999) ===
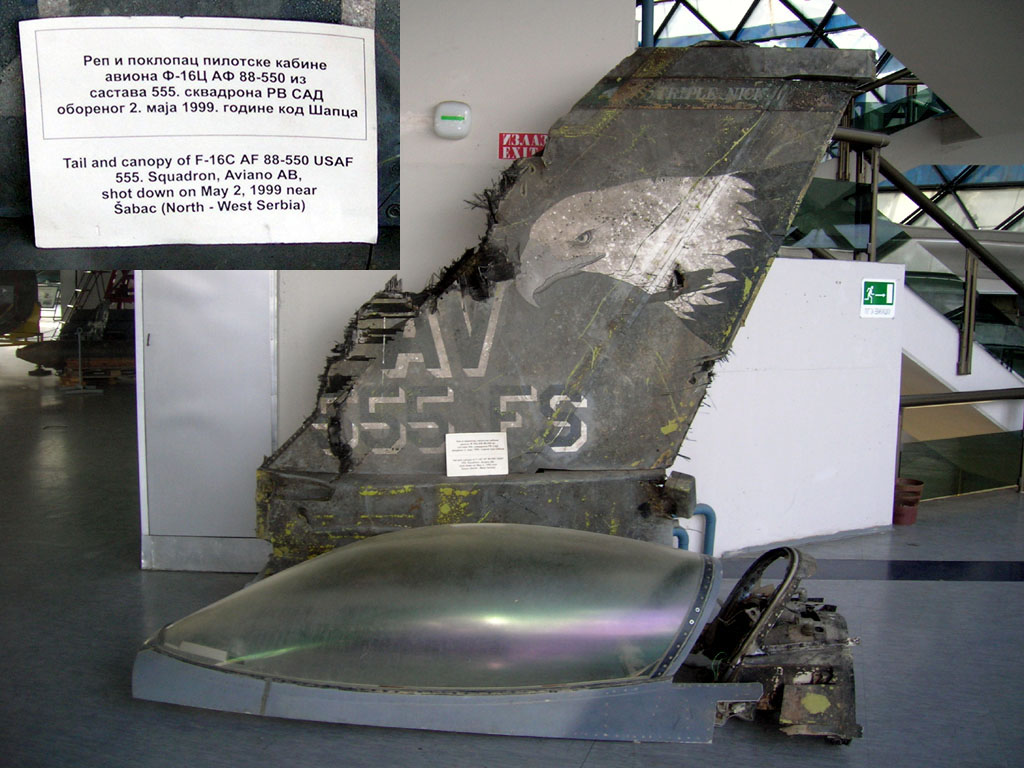
Tail and canopy of F-16CG in Belgrade Aviation Museum, Serbia

F-16s were also employed by NATO during Bosnian peacekeeping operations in 1994–95 in ground-attack missions and enforcing the no-fly-zone over Bosnia (Operation Deny Flight). The first incident took place on 28 February 1994, four J-21 and two IJ-21 Jastrebs, and two J-22 Oraos had violated the no-fly-zone to conduct a bombing run on Novi Travnik. The pilots of the two J-22s spotted the F-16s above them and after their attack, they left the area in low-level flight towards Croatia, where the U.S. jets could not follow. Meanwhile, the rest of the group was engaged and attacked, first by two USAF F-16Cs, which scored three kills. The remaining J-21 was destroyed by a different pair of USAF F-16Cs. Of the six Yugoslavian jets engaged, four were shot down (one by AMRAAM and the others by Sidewinders). On 2 June 1995, one F-16C was shot down by a Serb 2K12 Kub SAM (NATO reporting name: SA-6 "Gainful") while on patrol over Bosnia. Its pilot, Scott O'Grady, ejected and was later rescued by USMC CH-53 Sea Stallion helicopter on 8 June.

NATO F-16s also participated in air strikes against Serbian forces in Bosnia and Herzegovina during Operation Deliberate Force in August–September 1995, and again in Operation Allied Force over the entirety of Yugoslavia from March–June 1999.

On 2 May 1999, a USAF F-16CG was shot down over Serbia. It was downed by an S-125 Neva SAM (NATO: SA-3 "Goa") near Nakucani. Its pilot, then-Lieutenant Colonel (later General and Chief of Staff of the U.S. Air Force) David Goldfein, 555th Fighter Squadron's commander, managed to eject and was later rescued by a combat search-and-rescue (CSAR) mission. The remains of this aircraft are on display in the Yugoslav Aeronautical Museum, Belgrade International Airport.

On 4 May 1999, a lone Yugoslav Mig-29 flown by Lt. Col. Milenko Pavlović attempted to intercept a large NATO formation that was returning to base after bombing Valjevo (the pilot's home town). The aircraft was engaged by a pair of USAF F-16CJs from the 78th Fighter Squadron and was shot down with AIM-120, killing the pilot. The falling wreckage was hit by a Strela 2M fired by the Yugoslav army in error.

=== Operations in Afghanistan (2001–2021) ===
F-16s have been used by the United States in Afghanistan since 2001. One USAF F-16 fighter was lost during the operations in Afghanistan: on 3 April 2013 a USAF F-16 crashed near Bagram Airfield in eastern Afghanistan's Parwan province killing its pilot. In 2002, a tri-national detachment known as the European Participating Air Forces (Danish, Dutch and Norwegian) of 18 F-16s in the ground attack role deployed to Manas Air Base in Kyrgyzstan to support Operation Enduring Freedom in Afghanistan. Manas Air Base was returned to Kyrgyzstan control in 2014.

=== Invasion of Iraq and post-war operations (2003–2024) ===
US F-16s participated in the 2003 invasion of Iraq, and the only loss suffered over Iraq during this phase was an F-16CG of the 388th Fighter Wing's 421st Fighter Squadron that crashed near Baghdad on 12 June 2003 when it ran out of fuel.

A US Army MIM-104 Patriot SAM fire-control radar was damaged on 25 March 2003 following a hit by an AGM-88 HARM anti-radiation missile fired from an USAF F-16C on a patrol over southern Iraq, when the radar established a lock-on onto the fighter and the F-16 RWR classified it as a SA-2 radar. On 7 June 2006, two USAF F-16s dropped two 500 lb (230 kg) guided bombs (one GBU-12 Paveway LGB and one GBU-38 GPS-guided "smart" bomb) destroying an al-Qaeda safehouse, killing Abu Musab Al-Zarqawi, the leader of Al-Qaeda in Iraq. On November 27, 2006 one F-16 was lost near Falluja during a close air support strafing run when the pilot remained focused on the target instead of pulling up. On 15 June 2007, an F-16C crashed when the pilot lost spatial orientation during a night close air support mission. The pilot was killed in the crash. On 15 July 2007, another F-16C crashed and burned out during takeoff when a tire blew. The pilot ejected safely.

On 25 February 2009, a USAF F-16 shot down an Iranian Ababil-3 UAV after it entered in Iraqi airspace.

In September 2010, USAF F-16s dropped two bombs providing close air support for an Iraqi Army unit that was overwhelmed by armed insurgents. This was the first air raid in Iraq since July 2009.

USAF F-16s were deployed to Iraq and Syria as part of Operation Inherent Resolve.

USAF F-16s, together with F-15E Strike Eagles, helped blunt an Iranian attack against Israel on 13 April 2024 by shooting down an unspecified number of Iranian one-way-attack UAVs.

=== Libya 2011 ===
USAF F-16s participated in the enforcement of no-fly zone over Libya as part of Operation Odyssey Dawn.

== Israel ==
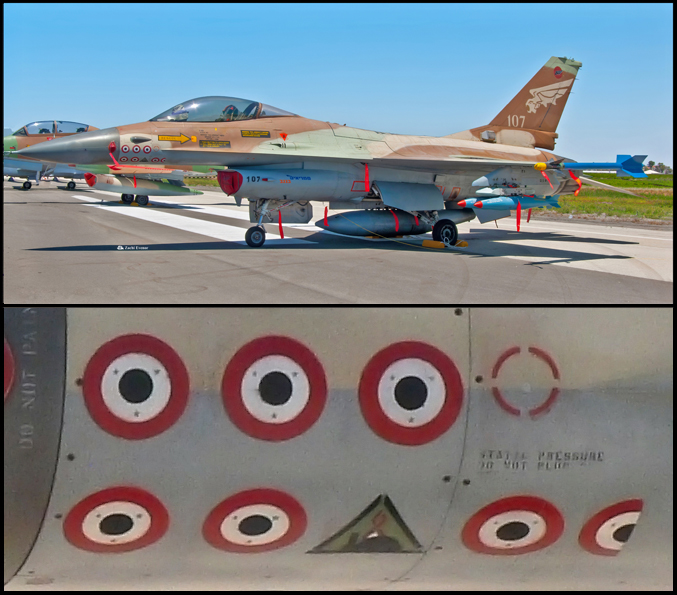
Israeli Air Force F-16A Netz 107 with 6.5 killing marks of other aircraft and one killing mark of Iraqi nuclear reactor, a world record for an F-16

=== Bekaa Valley and Osiraq raid (1981) ===
The F-16's first air-to-air combat success was achieved by the Israeli Air Force (IAF) over the Bekaa Valley on 28 April 1981, against a Syrian Mi-8 helicopter, which was downed with cannon fire following an unsuccessful attempt with an AIM-9 Sidewinder air-to-air missile (AAM). Several months later, on 14 July 1981, the IAF achieved the first F-16 "kill" of another fighter with a successful AAM shoot-down of a Syrian MiG-21.

On 7 June 1981, eight Israeli F-16s, escorted by F-15s, executed Operation Opera, their first employment in a significant air-to-ground operation. This raid severely damaged Osirak, an Iraqi nuclear reactor under construction near Baghdad, to prevent the regime of Saddam Hussein from using the reactor for the creation of nuclear weapons.

=== Operation Peace for Galilee (1982) ===
The following year, during Operation Peace for Galilee (Lebanon War) Israeli F-16s engaged Syrian aircraft in one of the largest air battles involving jet aircraft, which began on 9 June and continued for two more days (Operation Mole Cricket 19). At the end of the conflict, the Israeli Air Force credited their F-16s with 44 air-to-air kills, mostly of MiG-21s and MiG-23s, while suffering no air-to-air losses of their own. F-16s were also used in their ground-attack role for strikes against targets in Lebanon.

Soviet/Russian sources state the Syrians lost six MiG-23MFs, four MiG-23MSs and fourteen MiG-23BNs in the Bekaa Valley

=== Second Lebanon War (2006) ===
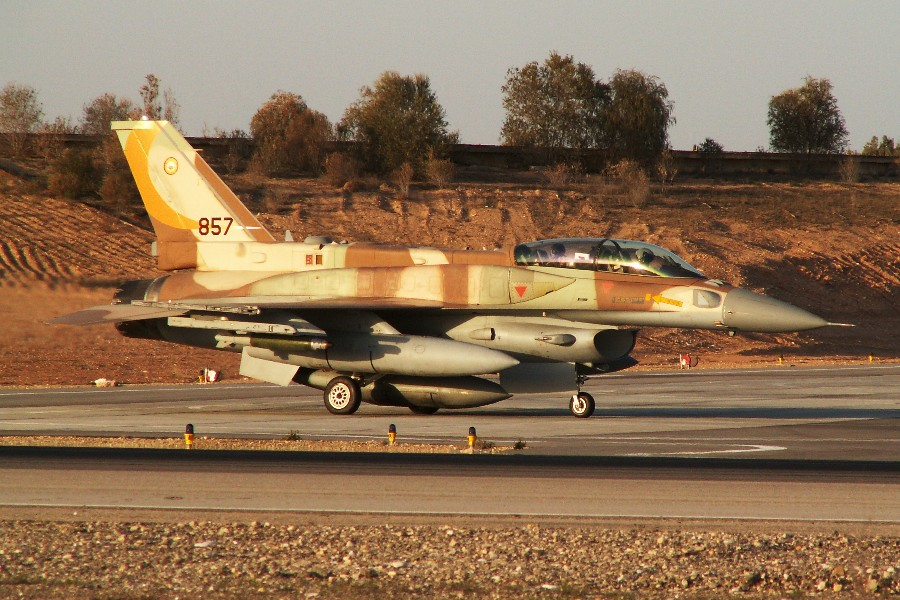
Israeli Air Force F-16I with CFTs and dorsal spine

Israeli F-16s, the bomber workhorse of the Israel Defense Forces, participated in the 2006 Lebanon War. The only reported F-16 loss was an IDF F-16I that crashed on 19 July when one of its tires burst as it took off for Lebanon from an air base in the Negev. The pilots ejected safely and there were no casualties on the ground. On 7 and 13 August 2006, Israeli F-16C, serial 364 and F-16D, serial 074, shot down two or three Hezbollah-operated Ababil-T UAVs during the war using Python-5 missiles.

=== Gaza War (2008–2009) ===
Israeli Defence Force F-16s were used in attacks in the Gaza strip in December 2008. The attacks hit at least 100 security compounds and rocket-launching bases and killed at least 225 people, including civilians and 140 members of Hamas security forces. No F-16s were lost.

=== 2009–present ===
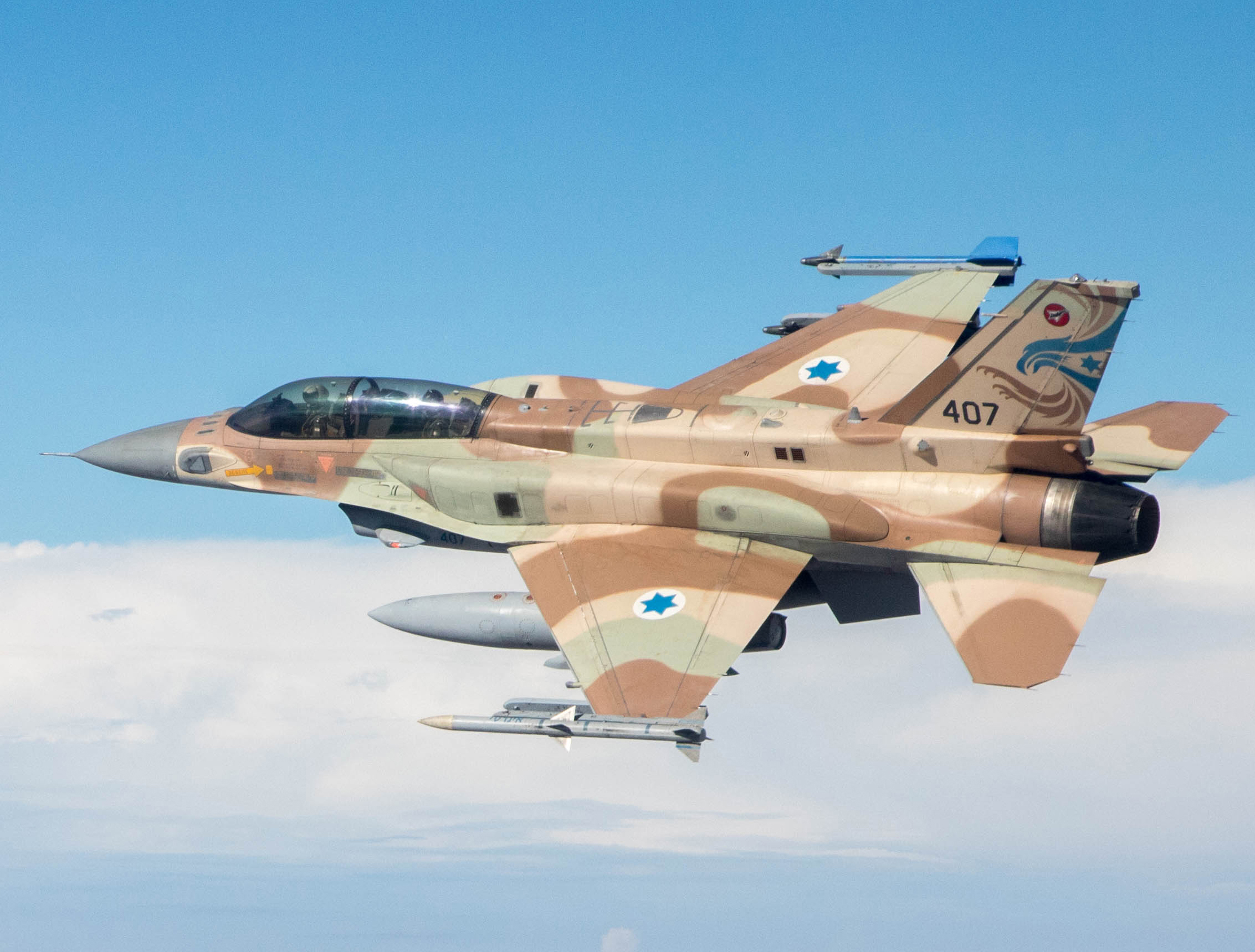
IAF F-16I Sufa escorting a new F-35I Adir stealth multi-role fighter.

The IAF lost one F-16I during a training mission in November 2010 with the loss of its crew.

On 16 December 2010, an Israeli F-16I shot down an unmanned "balloon" that had violated restricted airspace over Israel's Negev Nuclear Research Centre. It is widely believed that this center is where Israel's arsenal of nuclear weapons is produced.

On 6 October 2012, an Israeli F-16I, serial 844, shot down an unmanned aerial vehicle over southern Israel using two Python-5 missiles, the first one missing the target.

On 25 April 2013, an Israeli F-16C shot down an unmanned aerial vehicle (UAV) from Lebanon over the sea off Haifa, in northern Israel using a Python-5 missile.

In September 2016 and February 2017 IAF F-16 fighters shot down Hamas drones (UAVs) near the Gaza Strip.

During the 2010s Israeli upgraded all of its Barak 1 (F-16C/D) and Barak 2 (F-16CG/DG) fleet to "Barak 2020" configuration, an MLU which gives them Sufa-grade avionics. In 2015 the Netz fighters (F-16A/B) were retired from service, with F-16 Netz 107 being put on display in the Israeli Air Force Museum. On 10 February 2018, an Israeli Air Force F-16I was shot down and crashed in northern Israel when it was hit by a Syrian Air Defense Force S-200 surface-to-air missile. Both pilots ejected and safely landed in Israeli territory. The F-16I was part of a bombing mission against Syrian targets around Damascus after a drone reportedly entered Israeli air space and was shot down.

=== Gaza War (2021) ===
Israeli Air Force F-16's were heavily involved in the strikes against Hamas infrastructure and tactical units in Gaza during the 2021 Israel–Palestine crisis. On 13 May 2021, an Israeli F-16 shot down a Hamas operated Shehab suicide drone with a Python-5 air to air missile.

== Egypt ==
On 16 February 2015, Egyptian F-16s performed air strikes on jihadi weapons caches and training camps in Libya in response to the murders of 21 Egyptian workers by masked militants affiliated with the Islamic State (ISIS/ISIL). The air strikes killed 64 ISIS fighters, including three leaders in Derna and Sirte on the coast.

== The Netherlands ==
=== Yugoslavia (1994–1995, 1999) ===
F-16s were employed by NATO during Bosnian peacekeeping operations in 1994–95 in ground-attack missions and enforcing the no-fly-zone over Bosnia (Operation Deny Flight).

NATO F-16s also participated in air strikes against Serbian forces in Bosnia and Herzegovina during Operation Deliberate Force in August–September 1995, and again in Operation Allied Force over Yugoslavia from March–June 1999. During Allied Force, Dutch F-16 J-063 flown by Major Peter Tankink shot down one Yugoslavian MiG-29, with an AMRAAM, flown by Lt. Colonel Predrag Milutinovic (callsign "Grof") . He ejected safely. This marked the first air-to-air kill made by a Dutch fighter since WW2.

=== Operations in Afghanistan (2001–14) ===
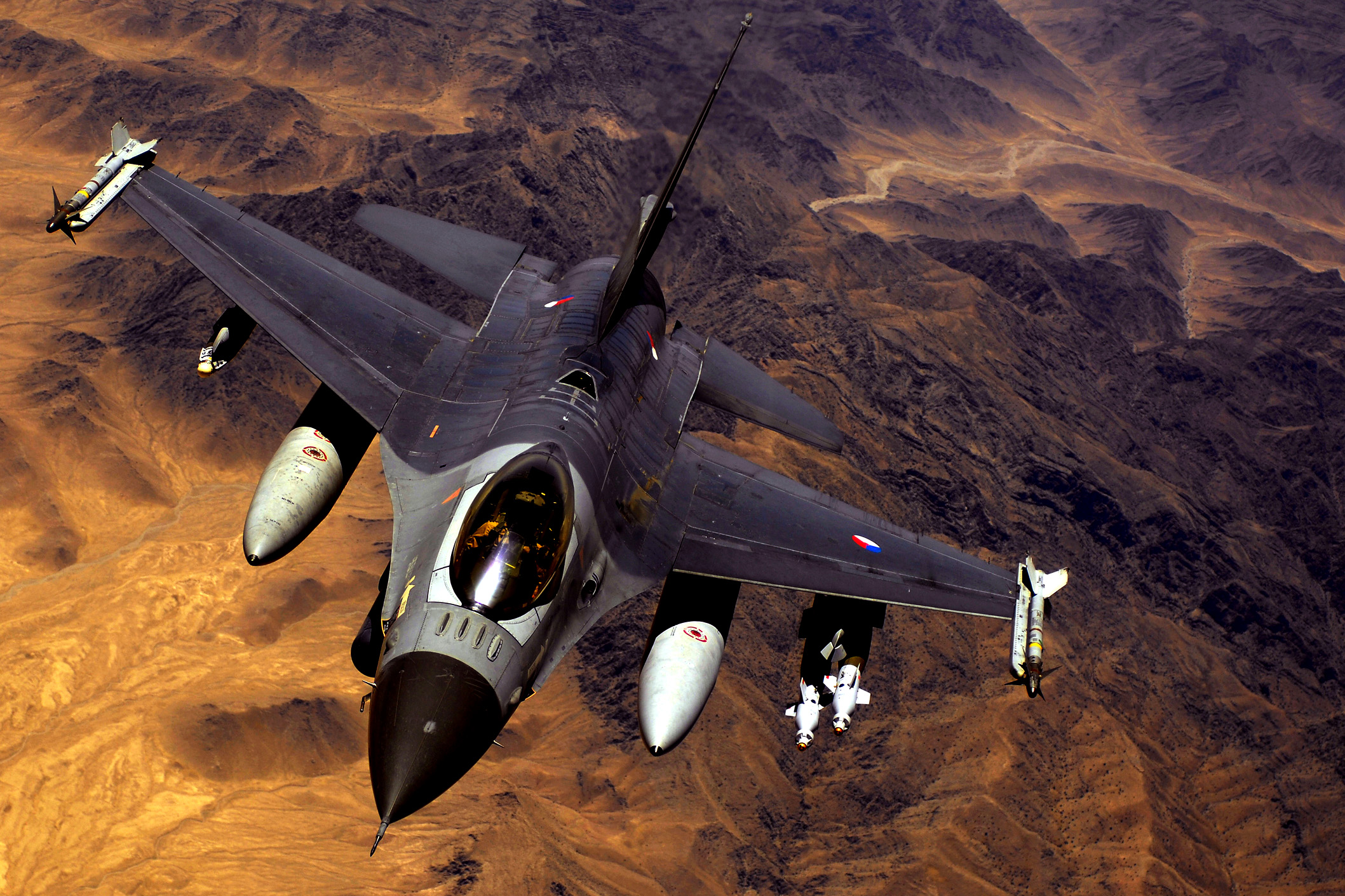
An F-16 of the Royal Netherlands Air Force over Afghanistan

After April 2005, eight Royal Netherlands Air Force F-16s, joined by four Royal Norwegian Air Force F-16s in February 2006, supported International Security Assistance Force ground troops the southern provinces of Afghanistan. The detachment is known as the 1st Netherlands-Norwegian European Participating Forces Expeditionary Air Wing (1 NLD/NOR EEAW). On 31 August 2006, a Royal Netherlands Air Force F-16AM crashed in Ghazni province and the pilot, Capt. Michael Donkervoort, was killed. No cause was determined, but the investigation referenced the fact that a camel spider and other creatures had recently been found in the cockpits of Dutch aircraft in Afghanistan.

=== Libya 2011 ===
Six Dutch F-16s operating from Decimomannu Air Base, Italy, in the framework of Operation Odyssey Dawn.

=== Iraq and Syria, 2014–2016 ===
Six F-16s and two reserve from the RNLAF are participating in the allied bombing actions against ISIL in Iraq, and since early 2016 also participate in raids in Syria.

=== The Netherlands air defence ===
Multiple times a year Dutch F-16s tasked with the defence of Dutch airspace as well as international airspace under Dutch protection intercept Russian Tu-95 (NATO Name:"Bear") bombers. They have been intercepted and escorted out of Dutch controlled airspace.

== Belgium ==
=== Balkans ===
Just before the Kosovo war started in March 1999, the first MLU aircraft were sent over to Italy. During that war, twelve F-16s of 349 sqn dropped live GBU-12 weapons. At that time the fighters were based at Amendola AFB in the south of Italy. After the conflict the number of F-16s decreased until the last F-16 returned home in 2001.

=== Libya 2011 ===
Six Belgian F-16 participated in missions in Libya in order to enforce the no fly-zone.

=== Afghanistan ===
From July 2005 to January 2006 4 Belgian F-16s formed a DATF agreement unit with 4 Dutch F-16s in Afghanistan. From 2008 onwards Belgian air force provided flights of 4 to 6 F-16s.

=== Iraq and Syria ===
From October 2014 to the present : alternating with the Dutch Airforce. Four F-16s are participating in the allied bombing actions against ISIL in Iraq and in raids in Syria Operation Inherent Resolve. The F-16 are based in Jordan.

=== Baltic States ===
Baltic Air Policing : Four F16 for four months (8 periods between 2004 and 2022).

== Denmark ==
=== Kosovo (1999–2000) ===
Six Danish F16s, later extended to nine, flew air defence and escort missions over Kosovo along with the Norwegian Air Force F16s. During the final phases of the campaign, the fighters also took part in several offensive missions targeting Yugoslav radar installations, fuel depots and command centers.

=== Afghanistan (2001–2003) ===
Six Danish F-16s flew 743 missions over Afghanistan from Manas Air Base in Kyrgyzstan during operation Enduring Freedom, as part of the European Participating Air Forces group along with Norway and the Netherlands, the missions included several weapon deliveries against various Taliban and Al Qaeda targets.

=== Libya 2011 ===
Six Danish F-16 fighters performed high-risk missions over Libya in order to enforce the no-fly zone.

== Norway ==
The F-16 is no longer in operational service in the Norwegian Air Force. It has been replaced by the F-35.

=== Bosnia 1993–1995 ===
Norwegian F-16s took part in Operation Deny Flight.

=== Kosovo 1999 ===
6 Norwegian F-16s were sent to Grazzanise Air Base in Italy to participate in Operation Allied Force for combat air patrol.

=== Afghanistan – Enduring Freedom ===
In October 2002, a tri-national force of 18 Norwegian, Danish, and Dutch F-16 fighter-bombers, with one Dutch Air Force KC-10A tanker, flew to the Manas Air Base in Kyrgyzstan, to support the NATO ground forces in Afghanistan as a part of the Operation Enduring Freedom. One of the missions was Operation Desert Lion.

=== Afghanistan 2006 ===
In support of ISAF – 4 Norwegian F-16s.

=== Libya 2011 ===
Six Norwegian F-16 fighters participated in missions over Libya in order to enforce the no-fly zone. During these missions, the Norwegian F-16s dropped some 600 bombs on targets in Libya, including the residence of Gaddafi.

== Pakistan ==
=== Incidents during the Soviet–Afghan War (1986–1988) ===
During the Soviet–Afghan War, between May 1986 and January 1989, Afghanistan claimed to have shot down one Pakistani F-16A during an encounter on 29 April 1987; the pilot ejected safely and landed in Pakistani territory. Pakistani authorities admitted to having lost a fighter jet to enemy fighters, but suggested that it may have been either an F-16 or an F-6 and insisted it was attacked over Pakistani territory. Subsequently, Pakistani officials confirmed that the loss was an F-16 in 1987, but asserted it was accidentally shot down in a friendly fire incident during a dogfight with enemy aircraft over Pakistani territory. According to this claim, Flight Lieutenant Shahid Sikandar Khan's F-16 was hit by an AIM-9 missile fired by another F-16 piloted by Squadron Leader Amjad Javed.

=== Kargil War (1999) ===
Although F-16As of the Pakistan Air Force (PAF) did not see combat in the 1999 Kargil War, they were initially employed in patrolling the border to ensure Indian Air Force (IAF) fighters did not cross the line of control. Later in the war, lack of spare parts due to sanctions imposed on Pakistan forced the PAF to withdraw its F-16 fleet from regular patrol duties. The PAF's main opposition was the MiG-29, used by the IAF to provide fighter escort for Mirage 2000s which were attacking enemy targets with precision guided munitions. According to Indian sources, IAF MiG-29s of 47 (Black Archers) Squadron tracked two PAF F-16As close to Indian air space with their radars, The MiG-29's with long-range BVR's were able to Lock the Pakistani F-16's while the Pakistani F-16s lacked BVR capability. However Indian Mig-29's decided not to attack as they were ordered because no official declaration of war had been issued. Pakistani sources state that the number of border violations by Indian aircraft dropped noticeably when F-16s were on patrol and that there were several cases of PAF F-16s and IAF Mirage 2000s tracking each other with their radars, but again no combat took place.

=== Operations in North-West Pakistan (May 2009–present) ===
The Pakistan Air Force (PAF) has been using their F-16A fleet to attack militant positions and support the Pakistan Army's operations in North-West Pakistan against the Taliban insurgency. Since May 2009, PAF F-16s have used 500 lb and 2,000 lb unguided and laser-guided bombs to attack caves, tunnels, training camps, ammunition dumps and hide-outs used by the militants. Over 100 combat missions have been flown in South Waziristan and over 300 in the Swat Valley as of 29 July 2009. Prior to the operations in the Swat Valley, approximately 10 of the PAF's F-16s were fitted with high-resolution infra-red sensors for reconnaissance purposes, supplied by the United States, to provide the Pakistani military with detailed imagery of the area.

Lockheed Martin had indicated back in May 2007 that it would be supplying Pakistan with 18 Sniper Advanced Targeting Pods (ATP) with deliveries starting in 2008.

=== 2019 Pakistan-India Standoff ===
On 27 February 2019, Pakistan Air Force officials stated that they had shot down two Indian Air Force aircraft (one Mig-21 and one Su-30MKI) after they intruded into the Pakistani airspace. Indian officials initially denied that any of Indian Air Force (IAF) jets were shot down. They also claimed that all IAF pilots were accounted for and denied that any IAF pilot was captured by the Pakistani security forces. However, later on Indian officials acknowledged that 1 IAF Mig-21 was shot down and its pilot was captured by Pakistani security forces. They, however, rejected shooting down of Su-30MKIs by PAF jets and also claimed to have shot down one PAF F-16 jet. However, Pakistani officials rejected Indian claims of shooting down of one F-16 belonging to Pakistan Air Force. Pakistani officials stated that "in this day and age it is impossible to hide downing of an aircraft". Initially, Pakistani officials also claimed to have captured two Indian Air Force pilots but later corrected their statement and stated that only one IAF pilot was in their custody. Pakistani officials stated that it was the fog of war which led them to believe that there were two IAF pilots in their custody. Pakistan also denied the use of F-16s in the operation, stating that JF-17s were used instead. The Indian Air Force presented a part of an AIM-120 AMRAAM to prove the use of F-16s by Pakistan Air Force in the operation. Indian media also attempted to show proof of shooting down of F-16 by displaying pictures of wreckage of IAF Mig-21 (which was shot down in Pakistan on 27 February) and claiming that it was the wreckage of F-16. However, this was rebutted by Bellingcat, an open source UK based investigative journalism network, which confirmed it as the wreckage of a MiG-21.

According to Foreign Policy magazine, U.S. officials with direct knowledge of the matter asserted that the US has recently completed a physical count of Pakistan's F-16s and has found none missing. Indian newspaper, Hindustan Times, reported that United States Department of Defense spokesman stated that he was "not aware" of any such investigation that was conducted and stated "As a matter of policy, the Department does not publicly comment on details of government-to-government agreements on end-use monitoring of US-origin defense articles". However, Washington Post reported that like Pentagon, the State Department has not issued a public statement on the F-16 count. However, there have been no counter-leaks contradicting the report published by the Foreign Policy. Local people on the ground have also rejected Indian claims of shooting down a PAF F-16. On 8 April 2019, the IAF released two radar images of aerial engagement to reassert its claims of downing an F-16. However, Pakistani officials rejected the radar images released by India. The only confirmed loss from the engagement was the MiG-21.

== Thailand ==
=== 2025 Cambodia–Thailand clashes ===
On 24 July 2025 at 10:58 (UTC+7.00) six Royal Thai Air Force F-16s bombed Cambodian positions in Chong An Ma, Ubon Ratchathani province with Thailand later claiming that Cambodia's 8th Infantry Division and the 9th Infantry Division command posts were destroyed as a result of the strikes.

On 25 July 2025 Cambodian Ministry of National Defence claimed that Thai forces, using F-16 jets, dropped bombs four times around Preah Vihear, three times on Wat Keo Sikha Kiriswar and one time in the Takrabei region and shelled a primary school in Oddar Meanchey province.

== Turkey ==
The Turkish Air Force acquired its first F-16s in 1987. 196 F-16C and 44 F-16D fighters were in service with the Turkish Air Force as of January 2012. Turkish F-16s also participated in the 2006 Baltic Aviation Police Mission in 2006.

=== NATO Operations Over Bosnia and Kosovo ===
Turkish Air Force F-16 units participated in the Bosnia Herzegovina and Kosovo by deploying one of its squadrons to Ghedi Air Base, Italy from 1993 and to Aviano Air Base from May 2000 in support of United Nations resolutions. The units completed 35,647 flight hours and 10,626 sorties without incident.

=== Aegean dispute with Greece ===
On 8 October 1996, 7 months after the escalation over Imia/Kardak, during an air-to-air confrontation over the Aegean Sea in the Athens FIR, a Greek Mirage 2000 fired an R550 Magic missile and shot down a Turkish F-16D. The Greek government claimed that the Turkish aircraft had violated Greek airspace, however, the Turkish government claimed that it had been on a training mission north of the Greek island of Samos, close to the Turkish mainland. The Turkish pilot died, while the co-pilot ejected and was rescued by Greek forces. Although the Turkish government has admitted the loss, the Greek government officially denies that the shootdown occurred. The loss was confirmed in 2012, after the downing of a RF-4E on the Syrian Coast. In response to a parliamentary question, Turkish Defence Minister İsmet Yılmaz stated that Turkish F-16D Block40 (s/n 91-0023) of 192 Filo was shot down by a Greek Mirage 2000 with a R.550 Magic II missile on 8 October 1996 after violating Greek airspace near Chios island.

On 23 May 2006, two Greek F-16 Block 52+ jets were scrambled to intercept a Turkish RF-4 reconnaissance aircraft and its two F-16 escorts off the coast of the Greek island of Karpathos, within the Athens FIR. A mock dogfight ensued between the two sides' F-16s, which ended in a midair collision between a Turkish F-16 and a Greek F-16. The Turkish pilot ejected safely after his jet was destroyed, but the Greek pilot died when his canopy and cockpit were destroyed during the collision.

=== Turkish raids over northern Iraq ===
Turkey's F-16s were extensively used in the nation's ongoing conflict with Kurdish rebels in Southeastern Turkey and Northern Iraq. Most notably during winter bombing campaign of 2008 Turkish incursion into northern Iraq where Turkey launched its first cross-border raid on 16 December 2007, involving 50 fighters before Operation Sun. This was the first time a night-bombing operation on a massive scale also the largest operation conducted by Turkish Air Force.

=== Syrian Civil War ===
During the Syrian Civil War, Turkish F-16s were tasked with airspace protection on the Syrian border. After the RF-4 downing in June 2012 Turkey changed its rules of engagements against Syrian aircraft, resulting in scrambles and downings of Syrian combat aircraft.

On 16 September 2013, a Turkish Air Force F-16 shot down a Syrian Mi-17 helicopter that had violated Turkish airspace over Hatay province, with an AIM-9X Sidewinder missile. The helicopter crashed on the Syrian side of the border. Part of the crew could bail out from the crippled helicopter, but were killed when they reached the ground and were captured by Syrian rebels.

On 23 March 2014, two TuAF F-16s from Diyarbakır were scrambled to intercept a pair of Syrian MiG-23s that were approaching the Turkish airspace while operating against rebel positions. After repeated warnings, one of the Syrian MiGs changed course while the other MiG strayed into the Turkish airspace for about 2 km, hence one of the Vipers downed the MiG with an AIM-120 AMRAAM near the border towns of Kasab and Yayladağı. The Syrian pilot ejected landing on the Syrian side of the border and was rescued. Also the crippled jet crashed on the Syrian side.

On August 29, 2015 Turkish F-16's launched a massive scale bombardment campaign in response to the Suruç terrorist attacks that killed 34 civilians in the small border town. As a result, F-16's stuck dozens of terrorist storage depots, stations, convoys and foot-presence, as-well as pushing the majority of ISIS's militia-structure back from Turkeys borders.

On 16 May 2015, a Turkish Air Force F-16 shot down an Iranian made Mohajer 4 UAV that had violated Turkish airspace over Hatay province entering 11 km into Turkish airspace. The UAV was downed with two AIM-9 Sidewinder missiles. Initial claims by the Turkish government mentioned an intruding helicopter was shot down, but later it was admitted that the downed aircraft was an UAV as claimed by the Syrian side.

On October 6, 2015, Turkish Air Force F-16's on combat air patrol near the Syrian border (CAP) intercepted a series of Russian Air Force Su-30 that ventured into Turkish air space over Hatay and further east over near Gaziantep. The simultaneous intruders reportedly turned back after warnings however some reports and an unofficial leaked Turkish Air Force statement suggest that it was shot down. Other reports suggest the downing near the Hatay province might have been a Syrian owned MiG-29. Russia claims it is un-aware of any-such incident over Gaziantep shower says that Hatay violation was caused by a combination of bad-weather and defensive maneuvers against SAM systems that only lasted "a few seconds". However Turkish Military radar tracked the war-plane in its airspace for five minutes and missile systems inside Syria were locked on Turkish jets for over four minutes.

On October 16, 2015, A Turkish Air Force F-16 shot-down a Russian-made Orlan-10 unmanned drone 3 km into Hatay airspace. The U.S. and Turkey claim the UAV belongs to the Russian military however Russia denied such incident, later acknowledging it but denying ownership.

On November 24, 2015, two Turkish Air Force F-16s shot down a Russian Su-24, claiming that it violated Turkish air space but Russia rejected Turkey's claim.

During an escalation between Syria and Turkey at the beginning of March 2020, the two countries confronted each other in open war, leading to a surge in air combat kills on the hand of Turkish F-16s against Syrian jets.

On 1 March 2020, two Syrian Su-24 strike bombers were shot down by Turkish Air Force F-16's using air-to-air missiles over Syrian Idlib province. All four pilots safely ejected. Both Syrian and Turkish forces confirmed the downing.

On 3 March 2020, a Syrian Arab Army Air Force L-39 combat trainer was shot down by a Turkish Air Force F-16 over Syrian Idlib province. Both Syrian and Turkish forces confirmed the downing. The pilot died.

=== 2020 Nagorno-Karabakh conflict ===
On 29 September 2020, during the 2020 Nagorno-Karabakh conflict an Armenian Su-25 crashed on the Armenian side of the border killing its pilot. Armenian officials claimed it was shot down by a Turkish F-16, showing the pictures of the crash site. Turkish and Azerbaijani governments dismissed the Armenian claim, saying that two Armenian Su-25 crashed due to non combat related causes. On 7 October 2020, satellite images of the Azerbaijiani airport in Ganja confirmed the presence of at least two F-16s in the apron, not far from the combat zone, but still not confirming their active role in the conflict.

== Venezuela ==
=== Venezuelan coup attempt (1992) ===
On 27 November 1992, two Venezuelan F-16s took part in the November Venezuelan Coup Attempt on the side of the government over the city of Barquisimeto and its Military Air Base. In particular, the two F-16As strafed targets on the ground and shot down one AT-27 Tucano and two OV-10 Broncos as these rebel-flown aircraft attacked loyalist army positions. At least one of the downed OV-10 Broncos was shot down with cannon fire at low speed and low altitude as captured on video. To avoid hitting civilian targets, the two F-16s flew in the outer perimeter of the city, while one rebel OV-10 Bronco tried to engage combat.

=== Anti drug operations ===
On 29 January 2015, a US registered Bombardier CL601 was chased and shot down off Boca Druif, Aruba by Venezuelan Air Force F-16s after failing to respond. Three bodies and 400 packets of drugs, mainly cocaine, were found.

== United Arab Emirates ==
=== Libya 2011 ===
F-16s from Emirates participated in the enforcement of no-fly zone over Libya.

=== Syria (2014) ===
Starting on 23 September 2014, Emirati F-16s joined the American-led intervention in Syria, part of Operation Inherent Resolve against the Islamic State of Iraq and the Levant. The Emirates restricted their operations to the Syrian theater only. At the end of December 2014, the Emirates halted air strikes because of inadequate plans for the rescue of downed pilots after the downing of Jordanian pilot Muath al-Kasasbeh.

=== Yemen (2015–2019) ===
30 Emirati F-16s participated in the Saudi Arabian-led intervention in Yemen as part of Operation Decisive Storm against the Houthis.

== Bahrain ==
=== Syria (2014–present) ===
Starting on 23 September 2014, Bahrain air force F-16s joined the American-led intervention in Syria, part of Operation Inherent Resolve against the Islamic State of Iraq and the Levant. Bahrain strikes are limited to the Syrian theater.

=== Yemen (2015–present) ===
On 30 December 2015, a Bahraini F-16C crashed in Jizan Region, Saudi Arabia a military source reported, the pilot ejected and survived the crash. The F-16 was already in flames before hitting the ground as recorded on video. Initially attributed to a technical malfunction, according to Tom Cooper, the F-16 was shot down by Anti-Aircraft guns or MANPADS.

== Morocco ==
=== Syria and Iraq (2014–present) ===
Starting on 10 December 2014, in their first deployment, Moroccan air force F-16s joined the American-led intervention in Syria and Iraq, part of Operation Inherent Resolve against the Islamic State of Iraq and the Levant. Morocco strikes both in Syria and Iraq, while being based in the United Arab Emirates.

=== Yemen (2015–present) ===
Morocco was among the first countries to participate in the Saudi Arabian-led intervention in Yemen, starting from 25 March 2015, targeting Houthis rebels allied with splintered elements of the Yemeni Armed Forces allied to the ousted president Saleh. The strike force was composed of the same six F-16s available for the strikes over Syria and Iraq against the ISIL, based in the Emirates.

On 10 May 2015, at 18:00 local time, one Royal Moroccan Air Force F-16C Block 52, serial number 08-8008, crashed while performing a mission as part of the Saudi-led intervention in Yemen, the pilot of a second F-16 said that he did not see any ejection. Originally missing for several hours, on 11 May, the Shia rebels showed the crash site, located near Nushoor, Sa'ada. They claimed they shot the jet down with anti-aircraft artillery fire, while the pilot was killed in the crash. According to Tom Cooper, the F-16 was shot down by Anti-Aircraft guns or MANPADS.

== Jordan ==
=== Syria (2014–present) ===
Starting on 23 September 2014, Jordanian Air Force F-16s joined the American-led intervention in Syria, part of Operation Inherent Resolve against the Islamic State of Iraq and the Levant. Jordan restricted its operations to the Syrian theater only.

On 24 December 2014, a RJAF F-16 crashed near Raqqa, Syria, and its pilot, Flight Lieutenant Muath al-Kasasbeh, was captured by Islamic State militants. Initially reported as shot down by enemy fire, the ISIL reported it downed the F-16 with a MANPADS while it was flying at low altitude. Later, the US CENTCOM rejected the claim, ruling out hostile fire as the cause of the crash, without further details.

On 10 May 2017, a Royal Jordanian Air Force F-16 fighter jet downed an unidentified drone entering the Jordanian air space from Syria.

=== Yemen (2015–present) ===
On 24 February 2017, a Jordanian F-16 crashed in Najran, Saudi Arabia a military source reported, the pilot survived the crash.

== Ukraine ==
=== Ukraine (2024–present) ===
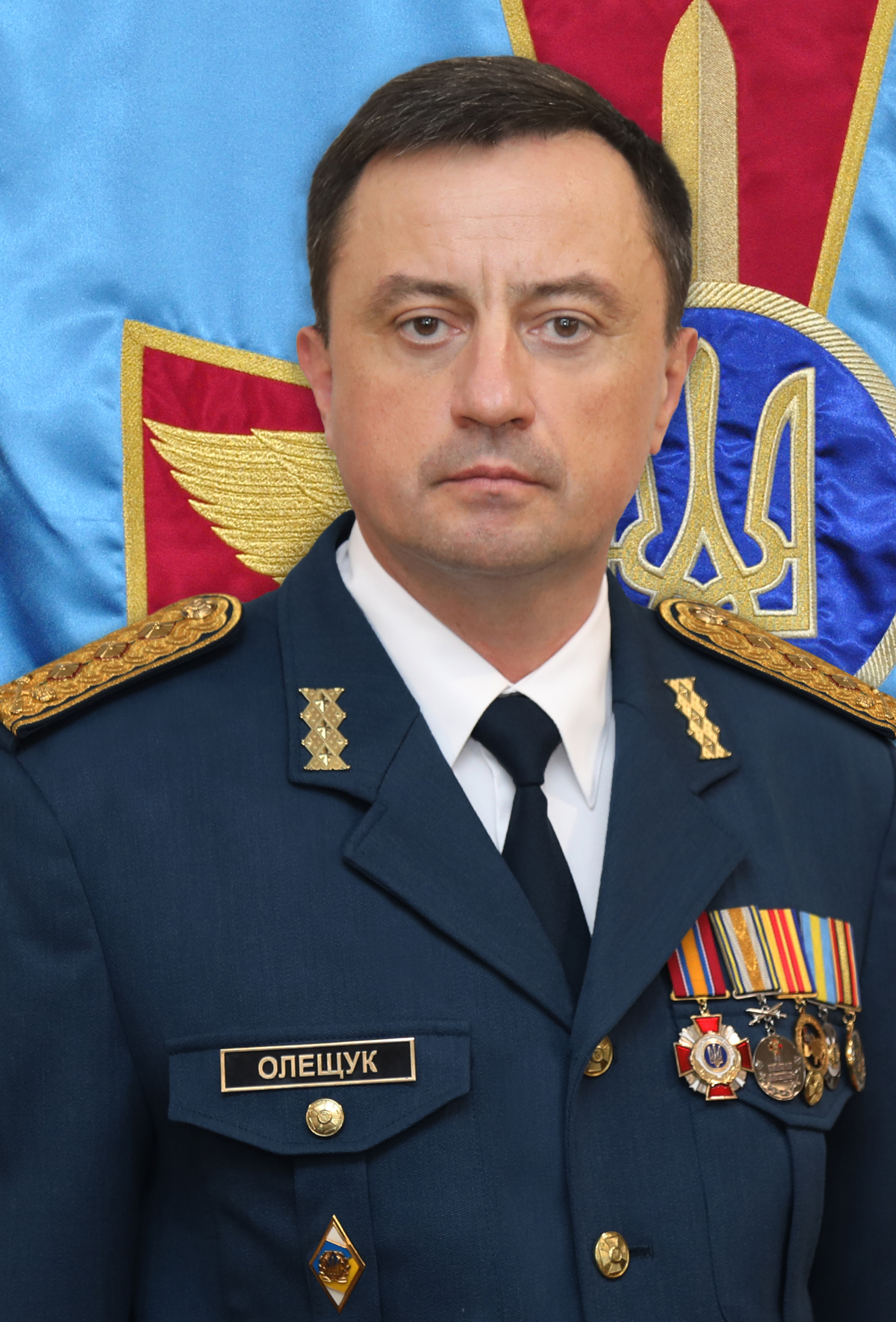
Ukrainian Air Force Commander Mykola Oleshchuk dismissed after the first loss of a F-16 in Ukrainian service.

On 4 August 2024, President Zelenskyy announced to the public that the F-16 was now in operational service with Ukraine. Zelenskyy stated at an opening ceremony that: "F-16s are in Ukraine. We did it. I am proud of our guys who are mastering these jets and have already started using them for our country,".

On 26 August 2024, Ukrainian F-16s were used in combat for the first time, intercepting Russian cruise missiles. The United States Air Force also reprogrammed the F-16s' electronic warfare systems using its threat libraries to help protect them from Russian weapons. They use older weapons such as the AIM-9L/M and AIM-120B, usually flying with a pair each of these missiles. Their deployment in air defense reflects the lack of pilots, lack of aircraft and no AWACS aircraft at the moment.

On 29 August 2024, a F-16 crashed, killing its pilot. The next day, the Commander of the Ukrainian Air Force, Mykola Oleshchuk, was dismissed by President Zelenskyy and replaced by Lieutenant General Anatolii Kryvonozhko. As of September 30, 2024, the cause of the crash was still under investigation. Theories include friendly fire from an air defense system, mechanical failure, or a pilot error. Ukrainian parliamentarian Maryana Bezuhla and Oleshchuk had previously argued over the cause of the loss of the F-16.

On 13 December 2024, according to the Ukrainian Air Force, a Ukrainian F-16 shot down six Russian cruise missiles in one sortie during a massive Russian missile attack.

On 12 April 2025, a F-16 was shot down by a Russian S-400 air defence system killing the 26 year old Ukrainian pilot, Pavlo Ivanov.

On 16 May 2025, a F-16 was lost during an operational mission amid a Russian drone attack. The pilot ejected and survived. On 29 June 2025, another F-16 was lost after crashing when drone debris hit the aircraft during a Russian airborne attack. The pilot Maksym Ustymenko died.

In July 2026, an F-16 shot down a Russian Su-35, marking the first air-to-air engagement in which a Ukrainian F-16 shot down a Russian fighter.

By November 2026, Ukrainian F-16s destroyed 4,700 drones and cruise missiles, according to the Ukrainian F-16 fighter wing commander. The fighters are heavily used in the counter-UAV role, and 85% of all intercepted drones were downed by F-16s. Most of the kills were registered using the onboard cannon, while missiles were kept as a last resort. F-16s have also conducted airstrikes alongside older jets using precision-guided munitions.

== Romania ==
=== Incidents during the Russo-Ukrainian war (2022–present) ===
The first time Romanian Air Force F-16s responded to an airspace violation during the war happened on 24 February 2022, when a Ukrainian Su-27 that had entered Romanian airspace was intercepted and escorted to a Romanian air base. In the following years, Romanian F-16s were continuously scrambled to monitor various Russian UAVs which had flown into Romanian airspace near the border with Ukraine.

On 19 May 2026, a Romanian F-16 participating in the Baltic Air Policing mission shot down a Ukrainian UAV that had been jammed by Russian electronic warfare over Estonia, marking the first Romanian aerial victory since 1945. Between 24 and 26 July 2026, Romanian Falcons downed the first Russian UAVs over the country. Three Shahed type drones were destroyed in the three consecutive days, two of which were destroyed by the same pilot.

On 20 August 2026, a Russian unmanned surface vehicle was further destroyed by a Romanian F-16 in the Black Sea, close to the Neptun Deep offshore gas platform. The naval drone was engaged with the 20 mm onboard cannon, and was the first naval drone to be destroyed by a Romanian F-16.

On 17 October 2026, two Russian Geran-4 drones were shot down by Romanian F-16s over Romania's territorial waters near Sulina. The event was the first time Romanian fighters downed Russian jet-powered drones.
