= 1st Air Force Combined Rifles Brigade =

1st Air Force Combined Rifle Brigade "Wild Duck" Detachment (2014-2023)
- Зведена стрілецька бригада Повітряних Сил
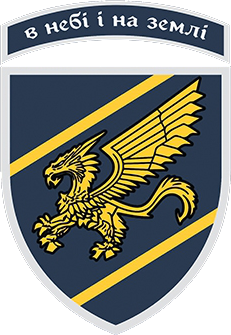
- Active: 1992 – present
- Country: Ukraine
- Allegiance: Armed Forces of Ukraine
- Branch: Ukrainian Air Force
- Type: Air force ground forces and special forces
- Role: Aerial Assault, infantry, combat support and reconnaissance
- Size: 200 personnel
- Part of: General Air Command
- Nickname: Polish Operatives (Note: Given by soldiers of the Donetsk People's Republic as most of its personnel during the Second Battle of Donetsk Airport came from Western Ukraine and had accents which sounded Polish which gave rise to rumors about the presence of Polish Special Operatives at the Airport, later the nickname was adopted by the detachment)
- Engagements: Russo-Ukrainian war: War in Donbas; Russian invasion of Ukraine

Commanders
- Current commander: Colonel Bohdan Bondar

Insignia
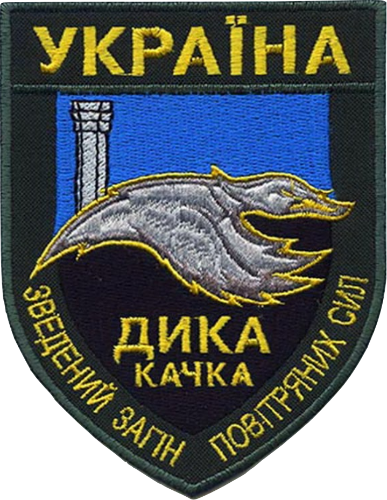
- Former Insignia

The 1st Air Force Combined Rifle Brigade is the one and only infantry brigade of the Ukrainian Air Force. It was initially established in 2014 as the "Wild Duck" detachment composed of troops from all the units of the Ukrainian Air Force. It is subordinated to the Air Force General Command and has seen intensive action throughout the War in Donbas and Russian invasion of Ukraine.

== History ==
The formation of the "Wild Duck" detachment of Ukrainian Air Force began on 15 September 2014 in the city of Vasylkiv following the order of Colonel-General Yuriy Baydak on 12 September 12, 2014. Colonel Bohdan Bondary was appointed as the commander of the detachment, Colonel Mykola Levytskyi was appointed as the detachment's deputy commander, and Lieutenant Colonel Oleksandr Berezin was appointed as the detachment's chief of staff.

The detachment was deployed to take up the positions at the Zenit point after the withdrawal of the 156th Anti-aircraft Missile Regiment as well as the entrance and above ground portion of the Butivka-Donetska mine, in order to reinforce the Donetsk Airport by providing defense to the northern approach to the airport.

On 23 August 2014, the detachment saw combat in the battle for the village of Lysiche, a battle in which the Ukrainian casualties were five killed and one missing but 86 Russian soldiers and separatists were killed.

The detachment arrived in the area where the operation was to be carried out and was stationed on the outskirts of Tonenke on 27 September 2014. On 29 September 2014, at 04:25, the detachment was fired upon by separatist BM-21 Grads which destroyed two vehicles containing equipment and other stuff. Then, the detachment arrived at the Zenit position on 30 September 2014, accompanied by the tanks and armored personnel carriers of the 93rd Mechanized Brigade.

The detachment covered the northern approaches to Donetsk Airport and the first deployment lasted 45 days during October–November 2014 during which, with the exception of 2 November, the detachment wasn't attacked by separatist forces, unlike the regular attacks on Zenit position during the deployment of 156th Anti-aircraft Missile Regiment. On 27 October 2014, a soldier of the detachment (Kostyshyn Yaroslav Myroslavovych) was killed by shelling on Avdiivka by separatist forces near the Donetsk Airport.

On 22 January 2015, at 10 o'clock in the morning, a column of the separatist 1st Slavyansk Brigade, reinforced by 10 T-72 tanks and an MT-12 anti-tank battery moved towards the Donetsk Airport moved with Ukrainian recognizable tactical signs. Ihor Yemelyanov spotted their movement from the Zenit position. Colonel Oleksandr Turinskyi gave the order to fire from all available weapons, after 10 hours of intense battle the first column of separatists retreated followed by the second column. In the morning, the soldiers of the detachment captured the wounded and handed them over to the Security Service of Ukraine. In the battle, 50 separatists were killed and 7 were captured, in addition 2 BTR-80s and 4 MT-12s were also captured During the battle Ihor Yemelyanov personally destroyed seven BMPs and armored personnel carriers and two Ural-4320s using RPGs, inflicting heavy casualties. Moreover two personnel from the detachment (Vasyl Vasyliovych Petrenko and Popovych Denys Grigoryovych) were also killed during the battle in addition to the destruction of four APCs, three BMPs, seven Ural-4320s, one Kraz, four Rapier guns and damage to two tanks of the Mechanized Brigade.

The detachment also took part in the Battle of Avdiivka and on 23 March 2015, during the mortar and tank shelling of Ukrainian positions in Opytne and Avdiivka, a tank attacked the detachment's positions killing a soldier of the 11th Anti-aircraft Missile Regiment serving under the command of the detachment (Savitsky Yuri Mykolayovych) and wounding another.

On 13 April 2015, during one of the attacks by separatists on the Zenit position near Avdiivka, the fragment of a 120-mm mine shell hit the ammunition boxes in the dugout and the resulting explosion killed five soldiers of the detachment (Oleksiy Anatoliyovych Vovchenko, Dmytro Ivanovych Hura, Vasyl Mykolayovych Putanenko, Oleksandr Mykolayovych Tyshchenko and Bohdan Anatoliyovych Goncharenko) who were taking cover.

Following the Russian invasion of Ukraine, the detachment was reformed into the 1st Combined Rifles Brigade of the Ukrainian Air Force in February 2023 and the reformation was officially confirmed on 26 June 2023, the brigade was already serving on the frontlines in Donetsk Oblast and also saw combat during the 2023 Ukrainian counteroffensive for which fifteen personnel of the regiment received state awards.

On 9 September 2024, a soldier of the brigade (Muravsky Vadim Anatoliyovych) was killed in combat on the frontlines.

== Commanders ==
=== Wild Duck Detachment ===
- 1st Deployment:
  - Commander: Colonel Bohdan Bondar
  - Chief of Staff Oleksandr Berezin
- 5th Deployment:
  - Commander: Colonel Vyacheslav Khlopyachi
  - Chief of Staff: Kostiantyn Gerasimov
- 6th Deployment:
  - Commander: Colonel Ihor Levchuk
  - Chief of Staff: Lieutenant Colonel Viktor Misyura
- 7th Deployment:
  - Commander: Colonel Taiga
  - Chief of Staff: Colonel Igor Chikin

=== 1st Combined Rifles Brigade ===
- Colonel Bohdan Bondar (2023-)

== Sources ==
- Как винницкие летчики «Диких уток» на фронт посылали
- http://censor.net.ua/resonance/322733/bez_raznitsy_aeroport_gorod_selo_ili_kusok_polya_svoyu_zemlyu_nujno_zaschischat_starshina_brigady_takticheskoyi
- Загін «Дика качка» (продовження)
- «Бій тривав вісім годин. На нас ішли 10 танків і піхота» — полковник «Німець»
