= Serhii Drozdov =

Ukrainian military sniper pilot

- Сергій Дроздов
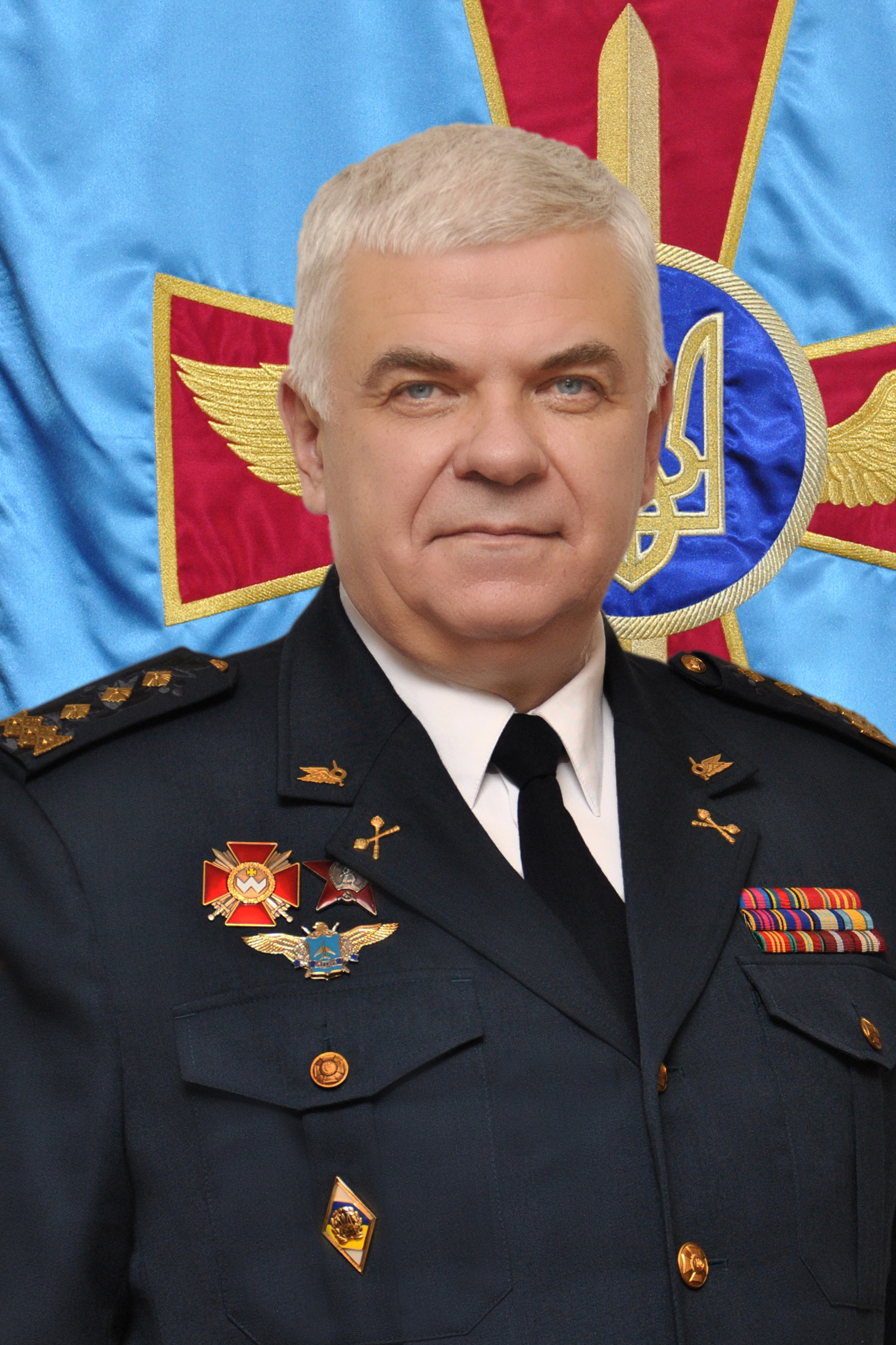
- Official portrait

Commander of the Ukrainian Air Force
- In office 20 July 2015 – 9 August 2021
- Preceded by: Yuriy Baydak
- Succeeded by: Mykola Oleschuk

Personal details
- Born: Serhii Semenovych Drozdov; 24 February 1962 (age 64) Chernihiv, Ukrainian SSR, Soviet Union

Military service
- Allegiance: Ukraine
- Branch/service: Ukrainian Air Force
- Years of service: 1983–present
- Rank: Lieutenant General
- Commands: Commander of the Ukrainian Air Force
- Battles/wars: Russo-Ukrainian War; War in Donbas; Russian invasion of Ukraine

Serhii Semenovych Drozdov (Ukrainian: Сергій Семенович Дроздов; born 24 February 1962) is a Ukrainian military sniper pilot, commander of the Ukrainian Air Force in 2015-2021, colonel general since 2016. As a pilot, he mastered such military aircraft as L-39, An-26, MiG-21, MiG-29, Su-27, and Mi-8 helicopter, and has a total flight time of over 2000 hours.

== Biography ==
=== Early life and education ===
Serhii Drozdov was born on February 24, 1962, in Chernihiv. In 1983, he graduated with honors from the Chernihiv Higher Military Aviation School of Pilots. In 1995, he graduated from the Gagarin Air Force Academy, and in 2009 from the Faculty of Operational and Strategic Training of the Ivan Chernyakhovsky National Defense Academy of Ukraine. In July 2012, Drozdov completed courses on language training and on foundations of security relations in modern Europe at the George C. Marshall European Center for Security Studies. In May 2016, he completed Generals, Flag Officers and Ambassadors' Course at the NATO Defense College.

=== Pilot career ===
Drozdov began his officer service in 1983 as a pilot of a fighter aviation regiment in Ivano-Frankivsk. In 1989-1993 he was a flight leader of a fighter aviation regiment in the Group of Soviet Forces in Germany. From 1993 to 2004 he served in Ivano-Frankivsk successively as a flight leader, as Chief of Air and Fire and Tactical Training — Senior Pilot of the Fighter Aviation Division, as Commander of the Aviation Squadron, as Deputy Commander of the Fighter Aviation Regiment, as Commander of the Fighter Aviation Regiment, and as Deputy Commander of the (Fighter) Aviation Brigade for Flight Training. In 2004, he was a senior inspector pilot of the Fighter and Assault Aviation Department of the Office of the Chief of Aviation of the Main Command of the Ukrainian Air Force.

=== At the air force command ===
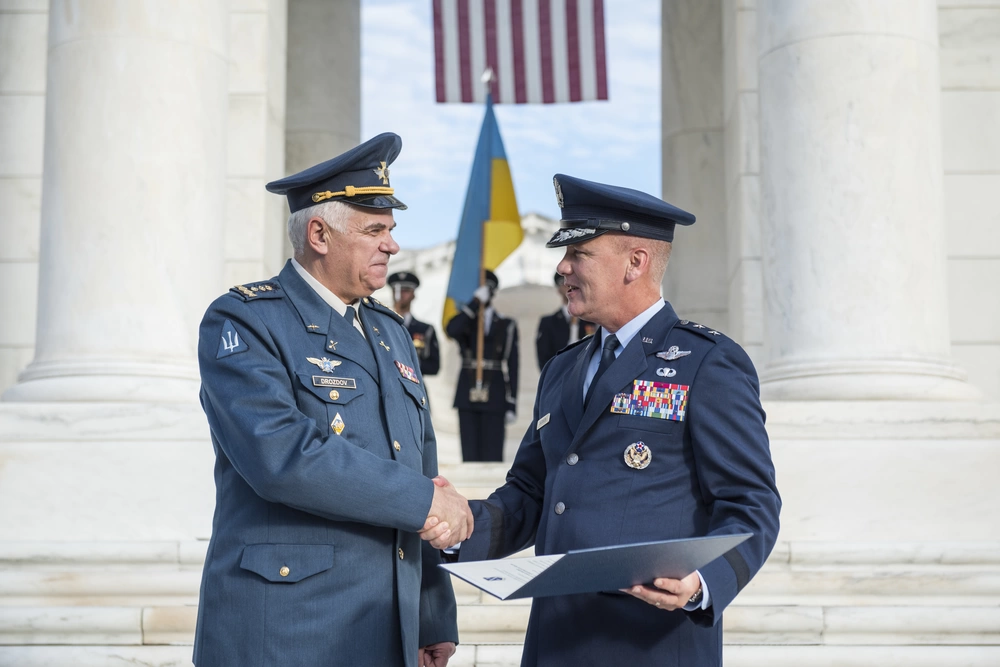
General-Colonel Serhii Drozdov and U.S. Air Force Maj. Gen. James Jacobson at Arlington National Cemetery

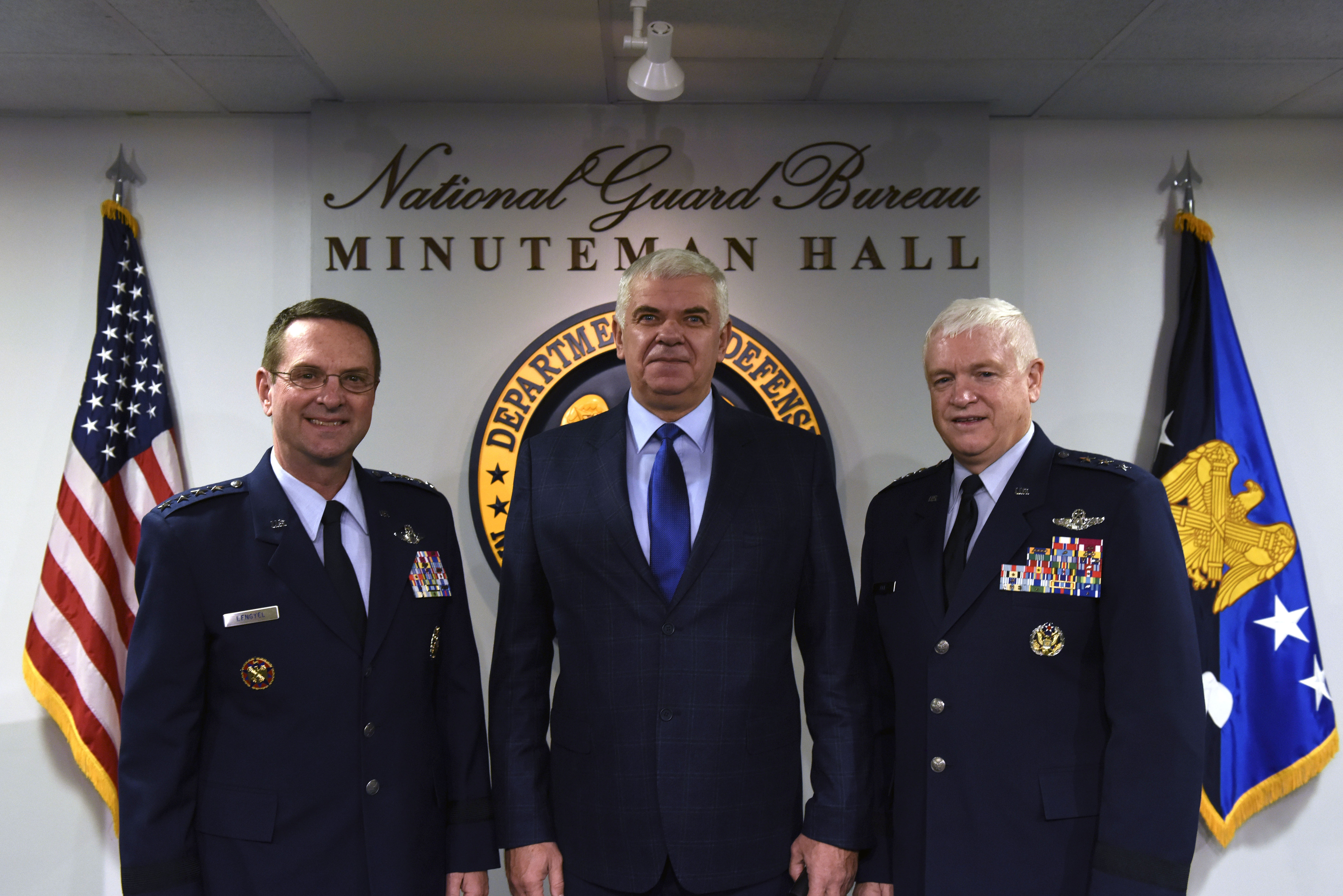
U.S. Air Force Gen. Joseph Lengyel, Ukrainian Air Force Commander General-Colonel Serhii Drozdov, and U.S. Air Force Lt. Gen. Scott Rice in the Pentagon

In 2004-2006, Drozdov was appointed Deputy Commander of the Air Command “Center” for Aviation — Chief of Aviation. In 2006, he becomes Head of the Aviation Training and Application Department of the Ukrainian Air Force Command. In 2009, he is appointed First Deputy Commander of the Air Command “South”. Drozdov was involved in preparations for Safe Skies 2011, a joint exercise for the US, Ukrainian, and Polish air forces at the Myrhorod Air Base.

In 2012, he was appointed First Deputy Commander of the Ukrainian Air Force. In the fall of 2014, Drozdov was retired to the reserve as part of a lustration at the Ministry of Defense of Ukraine. However, in March 2015, he was reinstated in his post in accordance with the Law of Ukraine “On Amendments to the Law of Ukraine “On Government Cleansing” Concerning Additional Measures to Ensure the State's Defense Capability”.

=== Air force commander ===
On July 20, 2015, Drozdov was appointed Commander of the Ukrainian Air Force. In December 2016, he led the control flight tests of medium-range anti-aircraft guided missiles near Oleksandrivka in the Kherson Oblast. In October 2018, he hosted Clear Sky 2018, a joint multi-national exercise at the Starokostiantyniv Air Base, primarily involving the U.S. Air Force and Ukrainian Air Force.

In March 2021, Drozdov presented the Air Force Vision 2035, which in particular provided for the transition to multirole 4++ generation aircraft, such as Gripen and F-15, and subsequently to the 5th generation F-35. The strategy also made it a priority for anti-aircraft missile forces to move to a new medium-range anti-aircraft missile system by 2025. On August 9, 2021, Drozdov was relieved of his post as Commander of the Ukrainian Air Force. In September 2021, he filed a lawsuit to appeal the President of Ukraine's decree on his dismissal from the post.

== Investigations ==
=== In Ukraine ===
On December 16, 2020, Ukraine's State Bureau of Investigation notified of suspicion commander of the Air Force of the Armed Forces of Ukraine Serhii Drozdov in connection with the An-26 crash near Chuhuiv. On December 22, 2020, the Pechersk District Court of Kyiv released Drozdov under personal commitment, obliging him not to leave the city, to report a change of residence, and to appear at the request of a court, prosecutor's office or investigator. Prior to that, the former commander of the Ukrainian Air Assault Forces lieutenant general Mykhailo Zabrodskyi, former defense minister Stepan Poltorak, and Servant of the People MP Iryna Vereshchuk requested the court to bail Drozdov out.

=== In Russia ===
On February 23, 2022, on the eve of the new Russian invasion of Ukraine, the Investigative Committee of Russia included Drozdov in the list of 85 Ukrainian military and political figures supposedly involved in “the killings of Russian-speaking people in Donbas”, which followed a pattern of previous cases initiated by Russian authorities against Ukrainian political and military figures, perceived in Ukraine as a form of political psychological pressure.

== Military ranks ==
- Major general (2010)
- Lieutenant general (2013)
- Colonel general (2016)

== Awards ==
- Order of the Red Star
- Order of Bohdan Khmelnytsky, 3rd class (2014)
- Order of Bohdan Khmelnytsky, 2nd class (2016)
- Legion of Merit (2018)
