= Volodymyr Antonets =

Air force officer

- Володимир Антонець
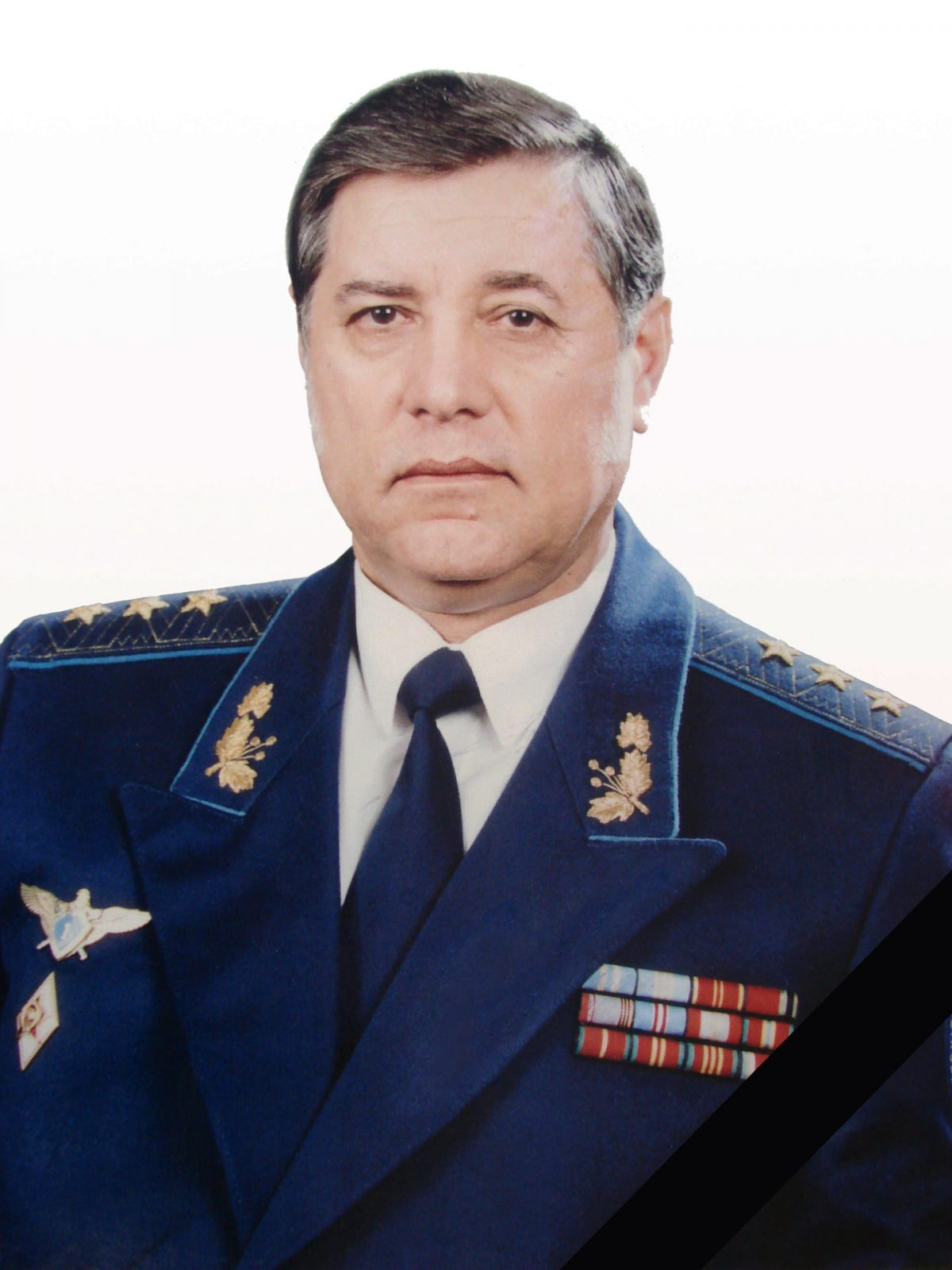

First Deputy Minister of Emergency Situations
- In office 11 November 2005 – 21 July 2010
- President: Viktor Yuschenko; Viktor Yanukovych
- Succeeded by: Mykhailo Bolotskykh

Deputy Minister of Defense
- In office 20 June 1996 – 19 May 1999
- President: Leonid Kuchma

Commander of the Ukrainian Air Force
- In office 28 January 1993 – 19 May 1999
- President: Leonid Kravchuk; Leonid Kuchma
- Preceded by: Valeriy Vasylyev
- Succeeded by: Viktor Strelnykov

Personal details
- Born: Volodymyr Mykhailovych Antonets; 7 March 1945 Pysarenky, Ukraine, Soviet Union
- Died: 19 November 2020 (aged 75) Ukraine

Military service
- Allegiance: Soviet Union; Ukraine
- Branch/service: Soviet Air Forces; Ukrainian Air Force
- Years of service: 1967–1999
- Rank: Colonel General
- Commands: Commander of the Ukrainian Air Force

Colonel General Volodymyr Mykhailovych Antonets (Ukrainian: Володимир Михайлович Антонець; 7 March 1945 – 19 November 2020), was a Ukrainian aviation officer, who last served as the Deputy Minister of Emergency Situations of Ukraine from 2005 to 2010.

He had served as the Deputy Minister of Defense from 1996 to 1999, having served as the Commander of the Ukrainian Air Force from 1993 to 1999.

He was an honorary citizen of Vinnytsia.

== Biography ==
Volodymyr Antonets was born on 7 March 1945 in Pysarenky, Reshetyliv district, Poltava Oblast.

In 1967, he served as a pilot, senior pilot, commander of an aviation unit, squadron commander — deputy commander, commander of a fighter aviation regiment, deputy commander of a fighter aviation division, commander of a fighter aviation division.

He finished the Air Force Academy in 1975.

In October 1988, deputy commander of the Air Force for combat training, first deputy commander of the Air Force. In December 1991, he has been the commander of the 14th Air Army of the Carpathian Military District.

He has higher education at the Armed Forces General Staff Academy in 1991. He has the specialty in command, and earned his qualification of operational-strategic upon his graduation from the Military Academy of the General Staff of the Soviet Armed Forces in 1991.

On 28 January 1993, Antonets was appointed Commander of the Air Force of Ukraine. He was extended from his appointed position on 18 February 1994. On 20 June 1996, Antonets was appointed as the Deputy Minister of Defense of Ukraine by President Leonid Kuchma, while retaining his position as commander of the air force. On 21 August, he was promoted to colonel general.

On 19 May 1999, he was dismissed as Deputy Minister of Defense and as Commander of the Air Force. On 12 December, Antonets was discharged from the army due to health reasons.

Since 2000, he has worked in public organizations.

On 11 November 2005, by decree of the president of Ukraine, Viktor Yuschenko, Antonets was appointed as the first deputy minister of Ukraine for emergency situations and for the protection of the population from the consequences of the Chernobyl Disaster.

On 10 July 2010, Antonets was suspended as the deputy minister, before ultimately dismissed as the deputy minister on 21 July by his successor, Mykhailo Bolotskykh.

He died on 19 November 2020 at the age of 75. He was buried at Baikovo cemetery.
