= Viktor Strelnykov =

- Віктор Стрельников

Commander of the Ukrainian Air Force
- In office 19 May 1999 – 27 July 2002
- President: Leonid Kuchma
- Preceded by: Volodymyr Antonets
- Succeeded by: Yaroslav Skalko

Personal details
- Born: Viktor Ivanovych Strelnykov; 1 July 1946 (age 80) Balta, Odesa Oblast, Ukraine, Soviet Union

Military service
- Allegiance: Soviet Union; Ukraine
- Branch/service: Soviet Air Forces; Ukrainian Air Force
- Years of service: 1976–2002
- Rank: Colonel General
- Commands: Commander of the Ukrainian Air Force

Colonel General Viktor Ivanovych Strelnykov (Ukrainian: Віктор Іванович Стрельников; born on 1 July 1946), is a Ukrainian former aviation officer who served as the Commander of the Ukrainian Air Force from 1999 to 2002. He was a military pilot 1st class.

== Biography ==
Viktor Strelnykov was born on 1 July 1946 in Balta, in Odesa Oblast. In 1969, he graduated from the Yei higher military aviation school of pilots.

He served in the forces of the Northern Group of Forces in the positions of pilot, senior pilot, unit commander, deputy commander of an aviation squadron - navigator.

After graduating from the Air Force Academy named after Yu. Gagarin in June 1976, he was part of the troops of the Trans-Baikal Military District in the positions of squadron commander, chief of staff - deputy commander of the fighter-bomber regiment, commander of the fighter-bomber aviation regiment, deputy commander of the aviation fighter-bomber division.

In November 1984, he was appointed as the commander of the aviation fighter-bomber division, and from February 1987, he was the first deputy commander of the Air Force of the Trans-Baikal Military District.

From May 1988 to August 1989, he was the first deputy commander of the 23rd Air Army. In August 1991, he was appointed to the post of commander of the 5th Air Army in the Odesa Military District. In the same year, he graduated from the Military Academy of the General Staff of the Armed Forces of the Soviet Union.

In April 1994, he became the Deputy Commander of the Air Force of Ukraine, and in November 1996, he was promoted as the First Deputy Commander of the Air Force of Ukraine.

On 19 May 1999, he was appointed Deputy Minister of Defense of Ukraine and as Commander of the Air Force of Ukraine. On 20 August 2001, he became solely the Commander-in-Chief of the Air Force.

On 27 July 2002, in the aftermath of the disaster at the Lviv airport "Sknyliv", he was dismissed as commander of the air force by President Leonid Kuchma. Two days later, was taken into custody.

In September 2002, he was dismissed from the Armed Forces of Ukraine.

On 31 January 2003, Strelnykov, along with 12 officers, was officially charged with negligence.
