= Mykola Oleshchuk =

Ukrainian general (born 1979)

- Микола Олещук
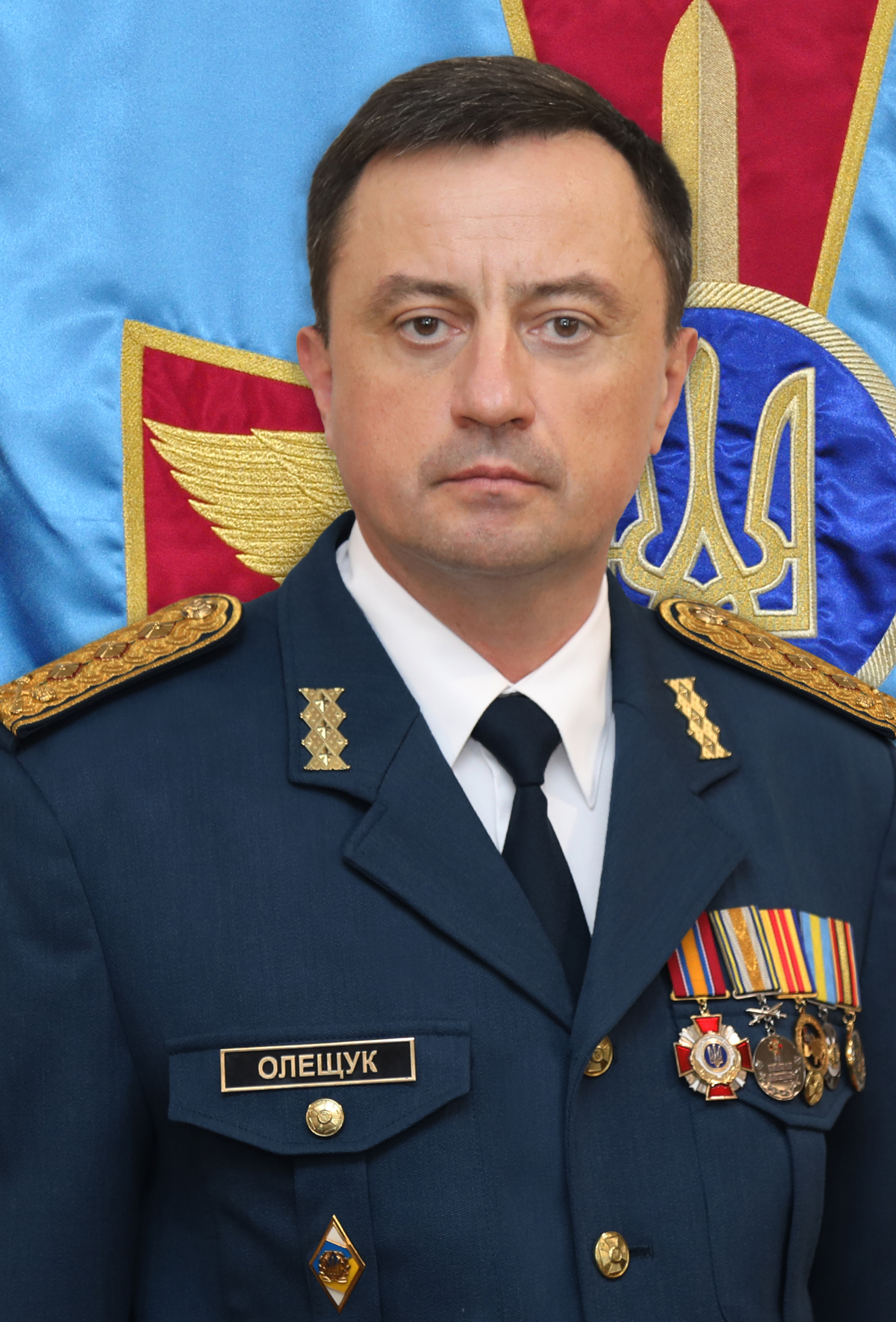
- Oleshchuk in 2021

Commander of the Ukrainian Air Force
- In office 9 August 2021 – 30 August 2024
- President: Volodymyr Zelenskyy
- Prime Minister: Denys Shmyhal
- Preceded by: Serhii Drozdov
- Succeeded by: Anatolii Kryvonozhko

Personal details
- Born: Mykola Mykolaiovych Oleshchuk; 25 May 1972 (age 54) Lutsk, Ukrainian SSR, Soviet Union
- Education: Ivan Chernyakhovsky National Defense University of Ukraine, Kharkiv National University, Zhytomyr Radio-Technical Institute
- Awards: Hero of Ukraine; Order of Bohdan Khmelnytsky 3d class

Military service
- Allegiance: Ukraine
- Years of service: 1993–present
- Rank: Lieutenant General
- Commands: Commander of the Ukrainian Air Force
- Battles/wars: Russo-Ukrainian War; War in Donbas; Russian invasion of Ukraine

Mykola Mykolaiovych Oleshchuk (Ukrainian: Микола Миколайович Олещук; born 25 May 1972) is a Ukrainian lieutenant general who served as the commander of the Ukrainian Air Force from 2021 to 2024.

== Biography ==
He was born in Lutsk on 25 May 1972.

He graduated from the Zhytomyr Radio-Technical Institute in 1994. In 2004, he graduated from Kharkiv National University with distinction and in 2010, he graduated from the Ivan Chernyakhovsky National Defense University of Ukraine. During his service in the Ukrainian Air Force, he specialized on the S-300 missile system.

In particular, from 2004 to 2006, he served as Deputy Brigade Commander for Armaments and Head of the Technical Unit of the 160th Anti-Aircraft Missile Brigade. From 2006 to 2009, Lieutenant Colonel Oleshchuk served as commander of the brigade. At the end of 2008, the 160th Brigade was recognized as one of the best units of the Armed Forces of Ukraine.

From 2010 to 2012, Mykola Oleshchuk served as Deputy Chief of Staff of Air Command South.

From 2012 to 2016, he served as Deputy Chief of Staff of the Air Force Command of the Ukrainian Armed Forces.

He was appointed commander of the Ukrainian Air Force on 9 August 2021.

On 14 October 2021, he was promoted to the rank of lieutenant general.

During the Russian invasion of Ukraine that began in 2022, Lieutenant General Mykola Oleshchuk organized effective air defence of Kyiv, Odesa, Lviv, Dnipro, and other cities. Through his decisions, aircraft of tactical and transport aviation brigades were withdrawn from the areas under attack, while successful operations involving aviation and surface-to-air missile forces were carried out, preventing enemy aircraft from gaining air superiority.

On 10 October 2022, during a massive Russian missile strike, his units, in cooperation with air defence units of the Ground Forces, destroyed one Su-25 aircraft, 45 missiles of various types, and 22 kamikaze drones of the Shahed 136 type. On 11 October 2022, eight such kamikaze drones, 20 cruise missiles, and three UAVs were destroyed.

On 30 August 2024, he was fired by President Volodymyr Zelenskyy a day after it was announced that an F-16 had crashed on 26 August. He was replaced by Anatolii Kryvonozhko.

== Awards ==
On 26 April 2022, Oleshchuk was awarded the third class Order of Bohdan Khmelnytsky.

On 14 October 2022, Oleshchuk was awarded the title of Hero of Ukraine by President of Ukraine.
