= Valeriy Vasylyev (general) =

- Native name: Валерій Опанасович Васильєв
- Born: Valeriy Opanasovych Vasilyev; 12 January 1946 (age 80); Shelukhivtsi, Belarus, Soviet Union
- Allegiance: Soviet Union; Ukraine
- Branch: Soviet Air Forces; Ukrainian Air Force
- Service years: 1962–1994
- Rank: Lieutenant general
- Commands: Commander of the Ukrainian Air Force
- Conflicts: Soviet-Afghan war

Lieutenant General Valeriy Opanasovych Vasilyev (Ukrainian: Валерій Опанасович Васильєв; born on 12 January 1946), is a Belarusian-born Ukrainian army officer who served as the Commander of the Air Force of Ukraine from 1992 to 1993. He is a 1st class military pilot.

== Biography ==
Valeriy Vasylyev was born on 12 January 1946 in Shelukhivtsi, Krasnopil district, Mogilev region (Belarusian SSR). In 1962, he joined the Soviet Army. He graduated from the Kachynsk Higher Military Aviation School of Pilots in 1966,. In 1970, he entered the Yury Gagarin Air Force Academy, which he graduated 3 years later.

In 1977, Vasylyev commanded the 927th Fighter Aviation Koenigsberg Red Banner Order of Alexander Nevsky Regiment of the 95th Fighter Aviation Division of the 26th Air Army. In 1980, he completed academic courses at the Gagarin Air Force Academy. In 1982, Vasylyev commanded the 95th Fighter Aviation Division of the 26th Air Army. In December of the same year, he was promoted to major general.

In 1983, Vasylyev was appointed deputy, and from January 1985, first deputy commander of the Air Force of the Turkestan Military District. Until 1985, he participated in combat operations during the Soviet-Afghan war. Vasylyev performed more than 250 combat missions on MiG-21, MiG-23, Su-17 and Su-25.

In July 1985, he was appointed commander of the Air Force of the Central Group of Forces. In 1986, he graduated from the Higher Academic Courses at the Military Academy of the General Staff. In June 1987, he was appointed commander of the Air Force of the Odessa Military District (since May 1988, 5th Air Army). In October 1988, he was promoted to lieutenant general.

In July 1989, he entered the Military Academy of the General Staff. In August 1991, after his graduation, he was appointed commander of the 24th Air Army of the Supreme High Command (VGK ON).

On 23 April 1992, on the recommendation of the Minister of Defense of Ukraine and military pilot Kostyantyn Morozov, Vasylyev was appointed as the commander of the Air Force of Ukraine. During that time, a large number of organizational measures, determined by the requirements of the new Military Doctrine of Ukraine, were carried out, and a new foundation was laid in the development of the Air Force of Ukraine.

Under leadership of the Air Force, led by Vasylyev, he planned to create the Air Force Directorate on the basis of the headquarters of the 24th Air Force (Vinnytsia) at the first stage. Four groups of operational control were formed: in the west of Ukraine (Lviv), in the south-west (Odesa), a control group of Military Transport Aviation, as well as reserve and personnel training. On 17 March 1992, Air Force Commander Vasylyev reported to the Minister of Defense of Ukraine on the completion of the establishment of the Air Force Command of the Armed Forces of Ukraine at the base of the 24th Air Army.

On 28 January 1993, he was dismissed as Commander of the Air Force, and has been replaced by Volodymyr Antonets.

On 21 June 1994, he was discharged from the Armed Forces of Ukraine. He lives in Moscow since.
