= Markovo, Mezhdurechensky District, Vologda Oblast =

Markovo Марково
- Village
- Location within Vologda Oblast Location within Russia
- Coordinates: 59°11′N 40°36′E
- Country: Russia
- Region: Vologda Oblast
- District: Mezhdurechensky District
- Time zone: UTC+3:00

Markovo (Russian: Марково) is a rural locality (a village) in Botanovskoye Rural Settlement, Mezhdurechensky District, Vologda Oblast, Russia. The population was 4 as of 2002.

== Geography ==
Markovo is located 35 km southwest of Shuyskoye (the district's administrative centre) by road. Svatilovo is the nearest rural locality.
