= Markovo, Syamzhensky District, Vologda Oblast =

Markovo Марково
- Village
- Location within Vologda Oblast Location within Russia
- Coordinates: 60°08′N 41°38′E
- Country: Russia
- Region: Vologda Oblast
- District: Syamzhensky District
- Time zone: UTC+3:00

Markovo (Russian: Марково) is a rural locality (a village) in Rezhskoye Rural Settlement, Syamzhensky District, Vologda Oblast, Russia. The population was 11 as of 2002.

== Geography ==
Markovo is located 44 km northeast of Syamzha (the district's administrative centre) by road. Monastyrskaya is the nearest rural locality.
