= Markovo, Beryozovsky District, Perm Krai =

Markovo Марково
- Village
- Location within Perm Krai Location within Russia
- Coordinates: 57°34′N 57°27′E
- Country: Russia
- Region: Perm Krai
- District: Beryozovsky District
- Time zone: UTC+5:00

Markovo (Russian: Марково) is a rural locality (a village) in Klyapovskoye Rural Settlement, Beryozovsky District, Perm Krai, Russia. The population was 121 as of 2010. There are 4 streets.

== Geography ==
It is located 8 km south-east from Beryozovka.
