= Markovo (village), Petushinsky District, Vladimir Oblast =

Markovo Марково
- Village
- Location within Vladimir Oblast Location within Russia
- Coordinates: 56°08′N 39°33′E
- Country: Russia
- Region: Vladimir Oblast
- District: Petushinsky District
- Time zone: UTC+3:00

Markovo (Russian: Марково) is a rural locality (a village) in Pekshinskoye Rural Settlement, Petushinsky District, Vladimir Oblast, Russia. The population was 7 as of 2010.

== Geography ==
The village is located on the Peksha River, 25 km north from Peksha, 32 km north-east from Petushki.
