= Markovo, Nikolsky District, Vologda Oblast =

Markovo Марково
- Village
- Location within Vologda Oblast Location within Russia
- Coordinates: 59°42′N 45°12′E
- Country: Russia
- Region: Vologda Oblast
- District: Nikolsky District
- Time zone: UTC+3:00

Markovo (Russian: Марково) is a rural locality (a village) in Niginskoye Rural Settlement, Nikolsky District, Vologda Oblast, Russia. The population was 156 as of 2002.

== Geography ==
Markovo is located 28 km northwest of Nikolsk (the district's administrative centre) by road. Filinsky is the nearest rural locality.
