= Yuriy Baydak =

Russian-born Ukrainian army officer

- Юрій Аврамович Байдак
- Born: Yuriy Avramovych Baydak; 19 February 1955 (age 71); Markovo, Russian SFSR, Soviet Union
- Military career
- Allegiance: Ukraine
- Branch: Ukrainian Air Force
- Service years: 1992-2015
- Rank: Colonel General
- Commands: Air Command South
- Conflicts: Soviet-Afghan War; Russo-Ukrainian War

Yuriy Avramovych Baydak (Ukrainian: Юрій Аврамович Байдак; born 19 February 1955) is a retired officer of the Soviet and Ukrainian Armed Forces who last served as the commander of the Ukrainian Air Force from 2012 to 2015.

Baydak also served as the first commander of the Air Command South from 2004 to 2006. He was promoted to the rank of colonel general in November 2013, and has the title of a 1st class military pilot.

== Biography ==
=== Soviet service ===
Yuriy Baydak was born in Markovo, Ivanovo Oblast on 19 February 1955. In 1976, he graduated from the Kharkiv Higher Military Aviation School. He began his officer's service as a pilot of a fighter aviation regiment in Byaroza, Brest region. Subsequently, he was the squadron chief of staff and unit commander.

In 1980, Baydak was sent to Poland to serve in the Northern Group of Forces at the Choyna Air Base, where he was promoted as the deputy squadron commander. After graduating from the Gagarin Air Force Academy in 1987, he was sent to Kakaydy, Surxondaryo Region, as the commander of the 1st squadron of a fighter aviation regiment. The military unit was stationed near the border with Afghanistan, so the personnel of the regiment were involved in combat operations during the Soviet-Afghan War. Baydak personally flew 98 sorties. In 1989, he was appointed deputy commander of the regiment.

During his service, Baydak mastered four types of aircraft, logging about 2,500 flight hours. In 1990, Baydak was sent to Altenburg to serve in the Western Group of Forces.

=== Ukrainian service ===
In June 1992, Baydak was appointed to the post of deputy commander of the Starokostyantiniv Fighter Aviation Regiment, and in July of the same year he took the oath of loyalty to the people of Ukraine. In the fall of 1992, Baydak was appointed commander of the unit. In December 1995, he became the commander of the Ivano-Frankivsk Fighter Aviation Division.

After the air parade over Khreshchatyk, dedicated to the 5th anniversary of the Independence of Ukraine, where the crews of the regiments subordinate to Colonel Baydak participated, he was subsequently promoted to Major General. After graduating from the National Defence Academy of Ukraine, from 1999 to 2002, he was the deputy commander of the 5th Aviation Corps, and from 2002 to 2004, he was promoted as the commander of the same unit.

In 2004, Baydak became the first commander of the newly formed Air Command South within the Ukrainian Air Force. In July 2006, after he left the post, he took over the functions of the head of the Center for Planning the Use of Airspace of Ukraine and Regulation of Air Traffic of the State Enterprise of Air Traffic Services of Ukraine.

On 9 June 2012, Baydak was appointed the commander of the Ukrainian Air Force. On 13 July 2015, he was dismissed as the commander and from military service.

== Family ==
Baydak is married, and has a son and a daughter.
