= Markovo, Yuryev-Polsky District, Vladimir Oblast =

Markovo Марково
- Village
- Location within Vladimir Oblast Location within Russia
- Coordinates: 56°41′N 39°30′E
- Country: Russia
- Region: Vladimir Oblast
- District: Yuryev-Polsky District
- Time zone: UTC+3:00

Markovo (Russian: Марково) is a rural locality (a village) in Simskoye Rural Settlement, Yuryev-Polsky District, Vladimir Oblast, Russia. The population was 20 as of 2010.

== Geography ==
Markovo is located 26 km northwest of Yuryev-Polsky (the district's administrative centre) by road. Sima is the nearest rural locality.
