= Markovo, Markovsky Selsoviet, Vologodsky District, Vologda Oblast =

Markovo Марково
- Village
- Location within Vologda Oblast Location within Russia
- Coordinates: 59°03′N 40°09′E
- Country: Russia
- Region: Vologda Oblast
- District: Vologodsky District
- Time zone: UTC+3:00

Markovo (Russian: Марково) is a rural locality (a village) in Markovskoye Rural Settlement, Vologodsky District, Vologda Oblast, Russia. The population was 13 as of 2002.

== Geography ==
The distance to Vologda is 26 km, to Vasilyevskoye is 4 km. Redkino is the nearest rural locality.
