= Markovo, Amur Oblast =

Markovo Марково
- Selo
- Location within Amur Oblast Location within Russia
- Coordinates: 50°32′N 127°22′E
- Country: Russia
- Region: Amur Oblast
- District: Blagoveshchensky District
- Time zone: UTC+9:00

Markovo (Russian: Марково) is a rural locality (a selo) in Markovsky Selsoviet of Blagoveshchensky District, Amur Oblast, Russia. The population was 1,327 as of 2018. There are 12 streets.

== Geography ==
Markovo is located on the left bank of the Amur River, 39 km north of Blagoveshchensk (the district's administrative centre) by road. Mikhaylovka is the nearest rural locality.
