= Commander of the Air Force (Ukraine) =

Commander of the Ukrainian Air Force
- Командувач Повітряних сил Збройних Сил України
- Ensign of the commander

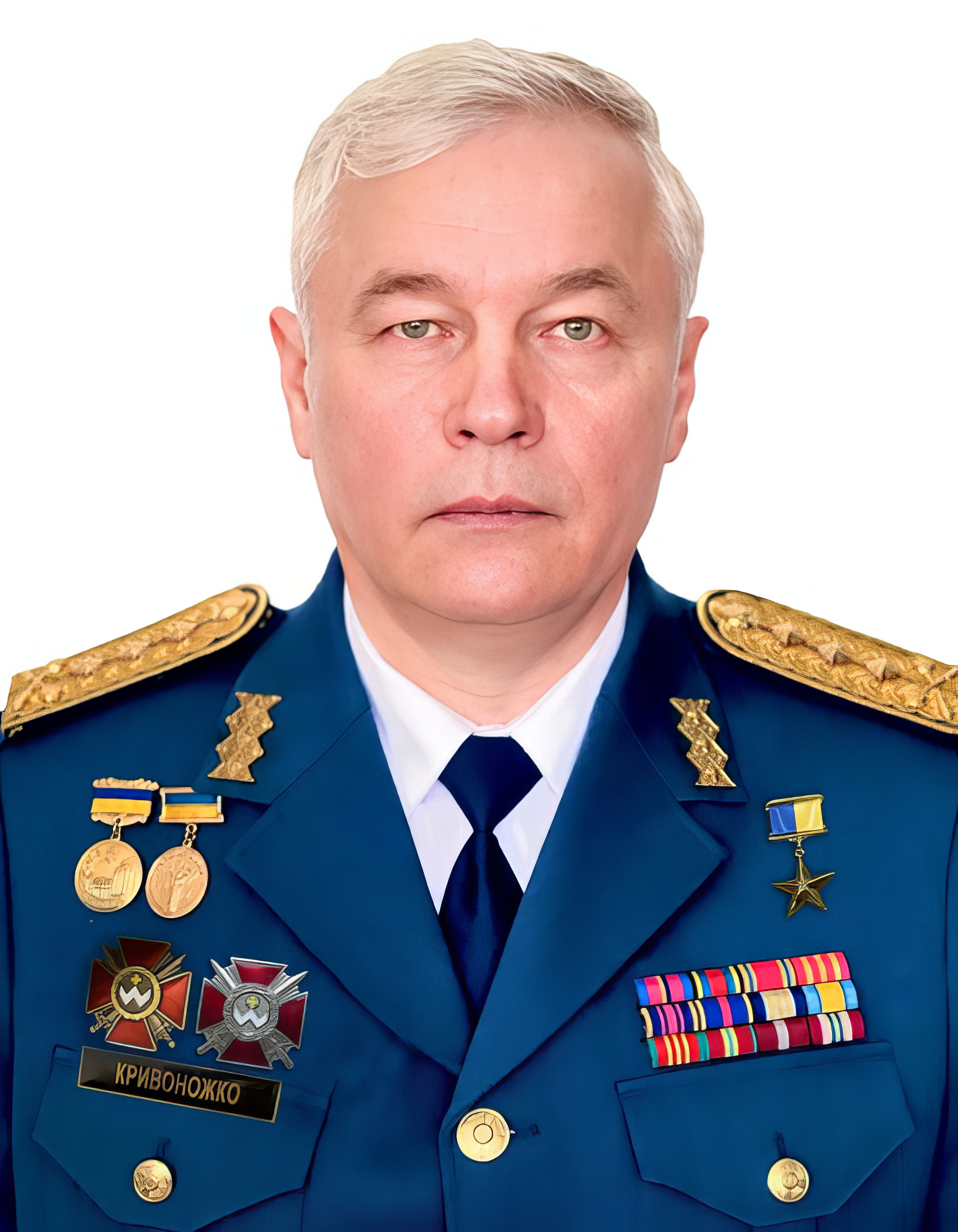
- Incumbent; Lieutenant General Anatolii Kryvonozhko since 30 August 2024
- Ukrainian Air Force
- Member of: General Staff of the Armed Forces of Ukraine
- Reports to: Commander-in-Chief of the Armed Forces
- Appointer: The president
- Formation: 1992
- First holder: Valeriy Vasylyev

The commander of the Ukrainian Air Force (Ukrainian: Командувач Повітряних сил Збройних Сил України, romanized: Komanduvach Povitryanykh syl Zbroinykh Syl Ukrainy) is the head of the professional and administrative head of the Ukrainian Air Force, and is under the commander-in-chief of the armed forces. The current commander of the air force is Lieutenant General Anatolii Kryvonozhko.

== List of commanders ==
Pre-merger with the Air Defence Forces (1991–2004)

- 1992 – 1993 Lieutenant General Valeriy Vasylyev
- 1993 – 1999 Colonel General Volodymyr Antonets
- 1999 – 2002 Colonel General Viktor Strelnykov (detained in 2002 due to the Sknyliv air show disaster)
- 2002 – 2004 Lieutenant General Yaroslav Skalko

Post-merger with the Air Defence Forces (2004–present)

No.	Portrait	Name (Birth–Death)	Term of office			Ref.
No.	Portrait	Name (Birth–Death)	Took office	Left office	Time in office	Ref.
1		Colonel general Anatoliy Toropchyn (born 1951)	May 2005	7 November 2007	2 years, 6 months	
2		Colonel general Ivan Rusnak (born 1952)	7 November 2007	12 August 2010	2 years, 278 days	
3		Colonel general Serhiy Onyshchenko (born 1954)	12 August 2010	8 June 2012	1 year, 301 days	
4		Colonel general Yuriy Baydak (born 1955)	8 June 2012	20 July 2015	3 years, 42 days	
5		Colonel general Serhii Drozdov (born 1962)	20 July 2015	9 August 2021	6 years, 20 days	
6		Lieutenant general Mykola Oleschuk (born 1972)	9 August 2021	30 August 2024	3 years, 21 days	
–		Lieutenant general Anatolii Kryvonozhko acting	30 August 2024	Incumbent	2 years, 8 days	

== See also ==
- Commander of the Ground Forces (Ukraine)
- Commander of the Navy (Ukraine)
- Commander of the Air Defence Forces (Ukraine)
- Commander of the Air Assault Forces (Ukraine)
- Commander of the Marine Corps (Ukraine)
