= Markovo, Vashkinsky District, Vologda Oblast =

Markovo Марково
- Village
- Location within Vologda Oblast Location within Russia
- Coordinates: 60°28′N 37°51′E
- Country: Russia
- Region: Vologda Oblast
- District: Vashkinsky District
- Time zone: UTC+3:00

Markovo (Russian: Марково) is a rural locality (a village) in Andreyevskoye Rural Settlement, Vashkinsky District, Vologda Oblast, Russia. The population was 4 as of 2002.

== Geography ==
Markovo is located 33 km northwest of Lipin Bor (the district's administrative centre) by road. Gavrilovskaya is the nearest rural locality.
