= Markovo (selo), Petushinsky District, Vladimir Oblast =

Markovo Марково
- Selo
- Location within Vladimir Oblast Location within Russia
- Coordinates: 55°51′N 39°17′E
- Country: Russia
- Region: Vladimir Oblast
- District: Petushinsky District
- Time zone: UTC+3:00

Markovo (Russian: Марково) is a rural locality (a selo) in Nagornoye Rural Settlement, Petushinsky District, Vladimir Oblast, Russia. The population was 133 as of 2010. There are 9 streets.

== Geography ==
Markovo is located on the Verkhulka River, 29 km southwest of Petushki (the district's administrative centre) by road. Pokrov is the nearest rural locality.
