= Anatolii Kryvonozhko =

Ukrainian general (born 1965)

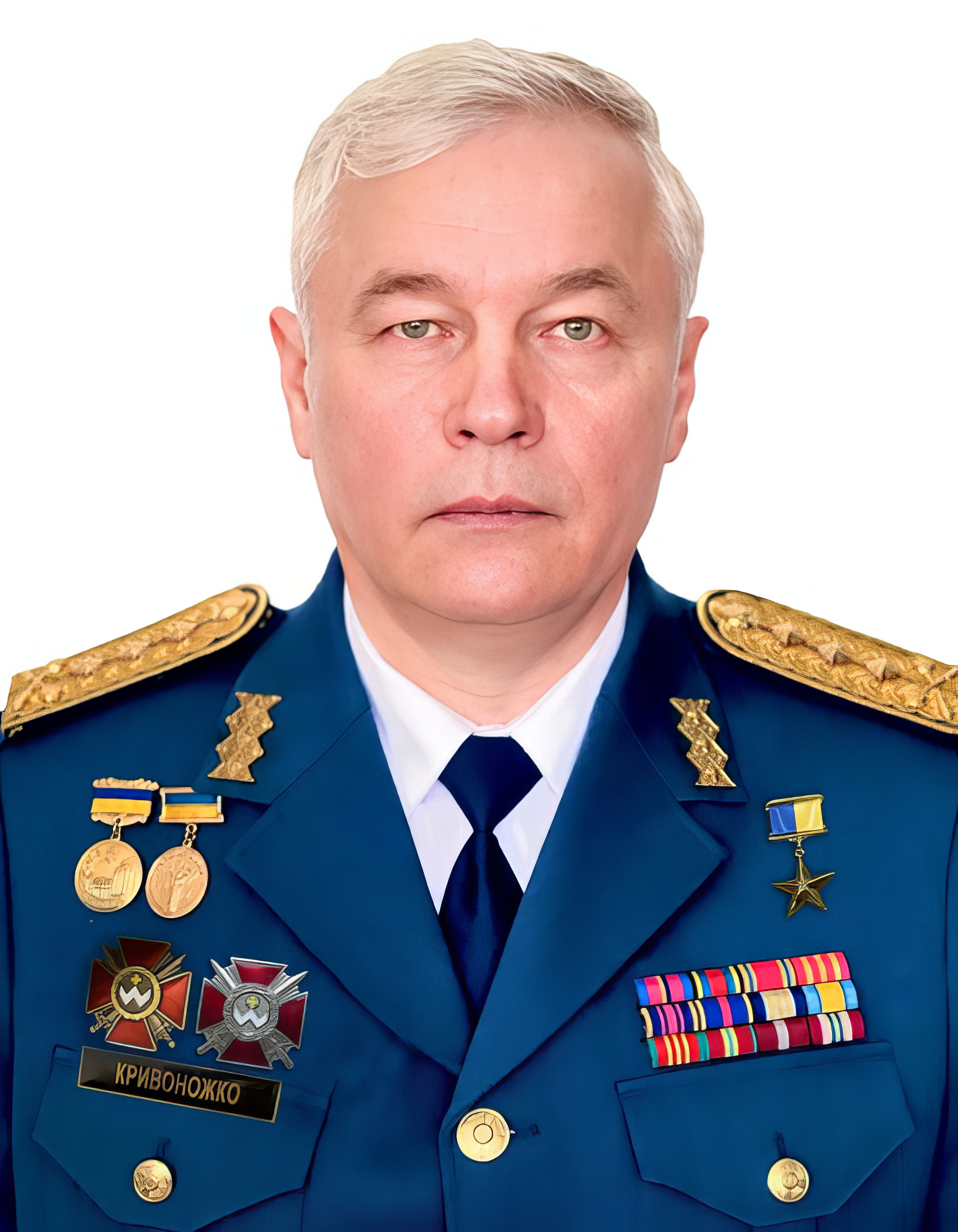
- Native name: Анатолій Кривоножко
- Born: 23 July 1965 (age 60)
- Allegiance: Soviet Union (to 1991); Ukraine
- Branch: Soviet Air Force; Ukrainian Air Force
- Service years: 1987–present
- Rank: Lieutenant general
- Commands: Commander of the Ukrainian Air Force; 114th Tactical Aviation Brigade
- Conflicts: Russo-Ukrainian war; 2022 Russian invasion of Ukraine

Anatolii Mykolaiovych Kryvonozhko (Ukrainian: Анато́лій Микола́йович Кривоно́жко; born 23 July 1965) is a Ukrainian Air Force lieutenant general, currently serving as the Commander of the Air Force. He served as acting commander from 30 August 2024 until President Volodymyr Zelenskyy appointed him commander on 3 August 2025.

== Career ==
Kryvonozhko graduated from the Kharkiv Higher Military Aviation School of Pilots in 1987 and initially flew Mi-8 and Mi-24 helicopters. He commanded the 114th Tactical Aviation Brigade from 2006 to 2008, served as deputy commander of the Ukrainian Air Force from 2008 to 2015, and commanded Air Command Center from 2015 to 2024. He has participated in Ukrainian military operations in eastern Ukraine since 2014.
