= F-16 training coalition =

International training program for Ukrainian pilots

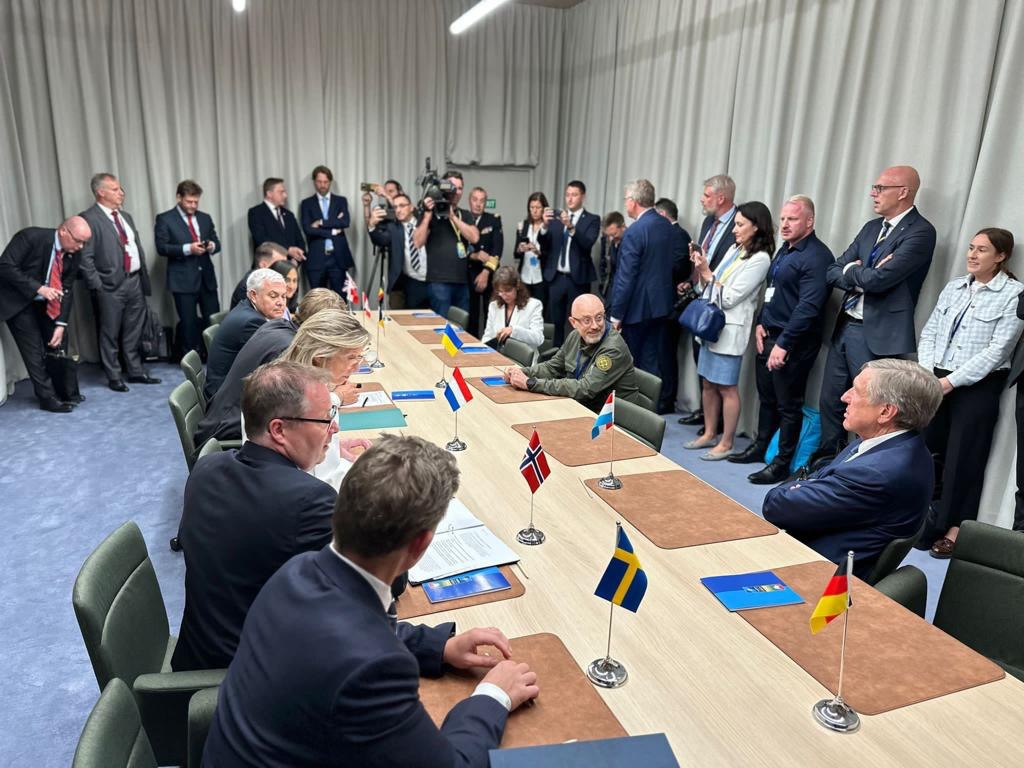
- The signing of the coalition Memorandum in Vilnius, Lithuania

- Coalition countries Ukraine
- Nickname: Ocean's 11
- Formation: 11 July 2023; 2 years ago
- Founders: Denmark; Netherlands
- Founded at: Vilnius, Lithuania
- Type: Military coalition
- Legal status: Active
- Purpose: Training of F-16 pilots and ground personnel
- Region served: NATO and allied countries
- Members: 14 countries and Ukraine List: Belgium; Canada; Denmark; France; Greece; Luxembourg; Netherlands; Norway; Poland; Portugal; Romania; Sweden; United Kingdom; United States

The F-16 training coalition is an international coalition formed on 11 July 2023 during the Vilnius Summit with the task of training F-16 pilots, technicians, and support personnel for the Ukrainian Air Force and providing the F-16 fighting jets. It originally consisted of 11 nations: Denmark, the Netherlands, Belgium, Canada, Luxembourg, Norway, Poland, Portugal, Romania, Sweden, and the United Kingdom, as well as Ukraine. The group was nicknamed the "Ocean's 11" by Ukrainian Minister of Defence Oleksii Reznikov, in reference to the US film Ocean's Eleven.

Throughout 2023-24, it was announced that Greece, the United States, Bulgaria, and France had also joined the coalition by aiding in the pilot training efforts as well.

As part of the coalition efforts, a training hub, the "European F-16 Training Centre", was set up in Romania. The Netherlands, Romania, and Lockheed Martin contributed to the creation and maintenance of this centre.

== Background ==
In February 2023, Prime Minister Rishi Sunak announced the United Kingdom's intent to train Ukrainian pilots for the F-16 fighter. As the country does not operate the F-16, it could only provide elementary and basic flight training. The British government also announced its intention to create an international coalition for providing Ukraine with air combat capabilities following a meeting between the British prime minister and his Dutch counterpart, Mark Rutte, at the Council of Europe summit in Iceland on 17 May. Soon, the United States, Portugal, Denmark, and Belgium also declared that they would join the initiative.

Later that month, it was reported that 20 Ukrainian pilots were to start their training in the UK. The training was to be limited to ground-based basics which would make the pilots ready for more specific F-16 training. In June, the Dutch government submitted a plan according to which the Ukrainian pilots would take part in basic flight training and programs that would increase English language proficiency. According to this plan, a training centre would also be established "in an eastern European NATO member state". Speculations appeared soon after that the NATO member in question was Romania, with the defence news site Defense Romania noting that Romania was the single NATO country operating the F-16 in the region and that the establishment of such a centre would also be beneficial for the country which bought 32 F-16s from Norway and faced challenges in training the required pilots.

At the beginning of July, it was announced that the Romanian Ministry of Defence was to sign an agreement with Lockheed Martin for the establishment of an F-16 training centre in Romania, on the condition that Romanian pilots were to have priority. This was confirmed by Ray Piselli, Vice President of International Affairs at Lockheed Martin, who said that the company received a request to set up a training centre that will serve Romanian and allied pilots, with the expectation of including Ukrainian pilots as well. On 6 July, following a meeting of the Romanian Supreme Council of National Defence ahead of the Vilnius Summit, Romania's possible participation in the international F-16 coalition and the hosting of the training centre were further discussed and approved.

== The F-16 coalition ==
On 11 July 2023, a memorandum was signed between 11 nations and Ukraine during the Vilnius Summit. As part of the signed memorandum, Ukrainian pilots, technicians, and support personnel were to participate in the training program. The coalition consisted of Belgium, Canada, Denmark, Luxembourg, the Netherlands, Norway, Poland, Portugal, Romania, Sweden, and the United Kingdom. According to the US Secretary of Defence Lloyd Austin, Denmark and the Netherlands took leadership of the formed coalition and the two nations are to outline the training plan. At the end of August, eight Ukrainian pilots and 65 additional personnel, arrived in Denmark at the Skrydstrup Air Base to conduct training on basic tactical and technical levels.

On 22 August, Ukrainian president Volodymyr Zelenskyy announced that Greece joined the coalition and will help with the training of Ukrainian pilots. Two days later, the United States announced its participation in training Ukrainian pilots as well. As reported by the Department of Defence, training in the US was expected to start in October at the Morris Air National Guard Base. A small number of Ukrainian pilots began training with the 162nd Wing around 25 October.

Bulgarian Minister of Defence Todor Tagarev also announced his country's intention of joining the coalition and providing training for medical personnel and ground crews. On 12 October, Tagarev signed a memorandum of cooperation with his Ukrainian counterpart which included assistance in English courses for the future Ukrainian F-16 pilots.

France joined the F-16 coalition in 2024. The country is to offer initial training for Ukrainian pilots before they could transfer for further fighter jet training offered by other coalition members.

== European F-16 Training Centre ==
After the Vilnius Summit, it was announced that the European F-16 Training Centre (EFTC) would be located at the 86th Air Base of the Romanian Air Force in Fetești, Romania. The training hub is funded by all coalition members, whilst Romania provides the infrastructure of the base, the Netherlands provides the F-16s for training, and Lockheed Martin provides the instructors through its subcontractors; Draken International and Gesellschaft für Flugzieldarstellung (GFD).

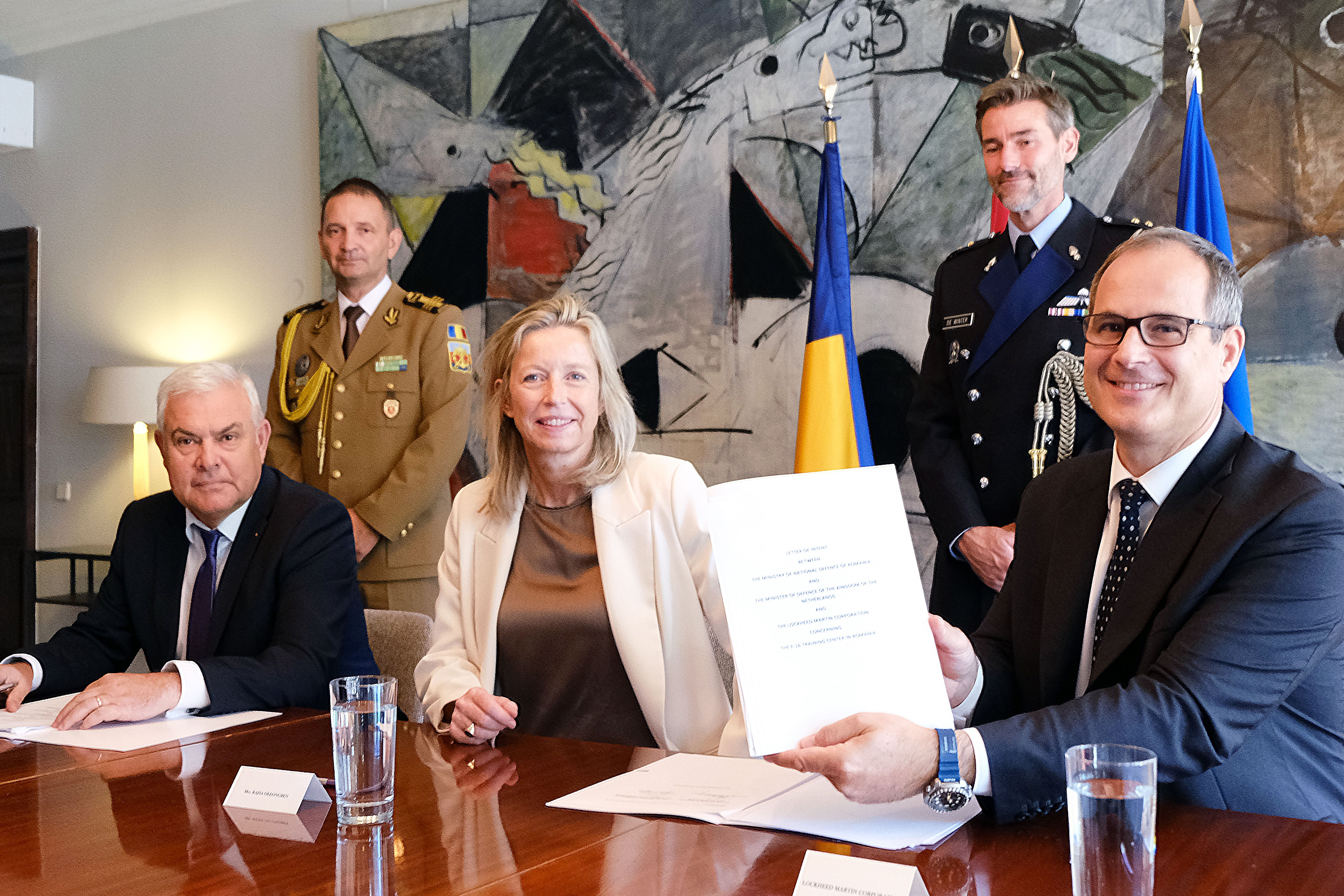
Letter of Intent signed by Romania, the Netherlands, and Lockheed Martin

During the August 2023 Informal Meeting of EU Defence Ministers in Toledo, a Letter of Intent regarding the establishment of the EFTC in Romania was signed by the Romanian Minister of Defence Angel Tîlvăr, the Dutch Minister of Defence Kajsa Ollongren, and Lockheed Martin executive Filippo Marchetti. Romanian Prime Minister Marcel Ciolacu also confirmed that the necessary approvals for initiating the training were secured.

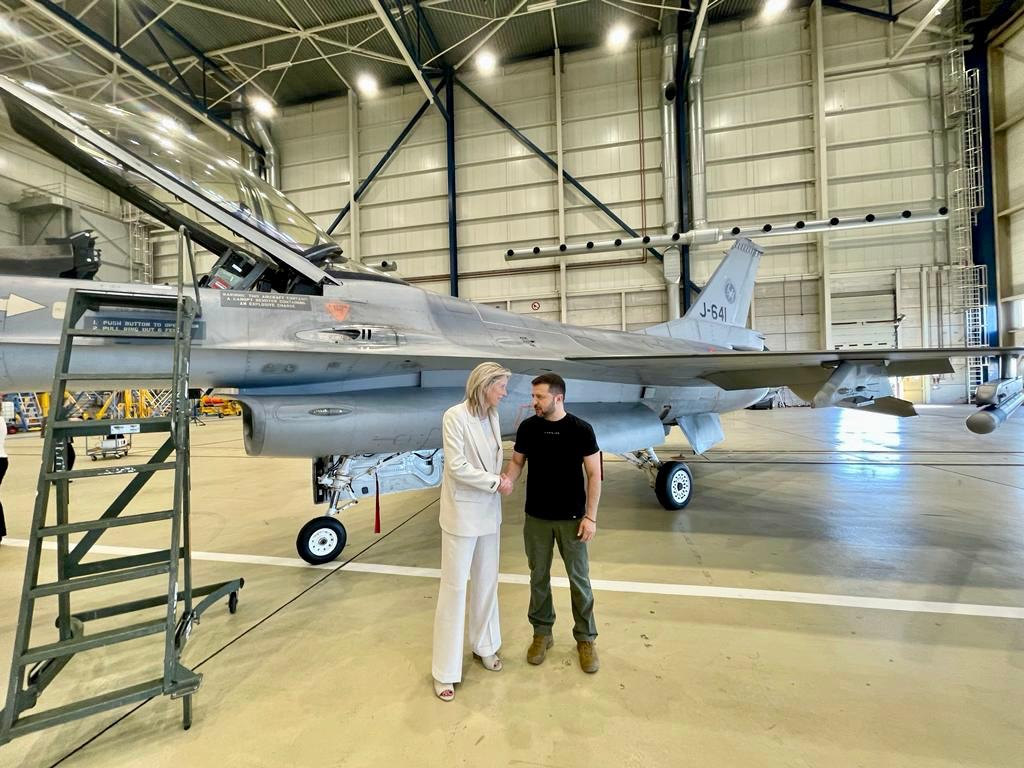
Ukrainian President Volodymyr Zelenskyy (right) with Dutch Minister of Defence Kajsa Ollongren at Eindhoven Air Base in the Netherlands (20 August 2023)

At the end of August, it was reported that the Netherlands would initially bring 12 F-16s to the EFTC. The number of F-16s could be further increased to 18 aircraft. Before training could start, these aircraft were first used for refresher training of the hired F-16 instructors. Training is carried out only in NATO airspace.

The first aircraft arrived on 7 November, with the EFTC being opened after an official ceremony on 13 November.

As agreed, Romanian pilots started their training first, then the centre expanded to include Ukrainian and other pilots. Following the visit to Romania on 10 October, President Zelenskyy announced that it was agreed to speed up the process and Ukrainian pilots were to be enrolled in the first wave of training. According to Dutch Chief of Defence Onno Eichelsheim, the Ukrainian pilots were to begin training at the centre in early 2024.

After a first batch of Romanian pilots finished their training in July 2024, Ukrainian pilots arrived at the EFTC in September as confirmed by the Ukrainian Minister of Defence.

== F-16 supplied to Ukraine ==
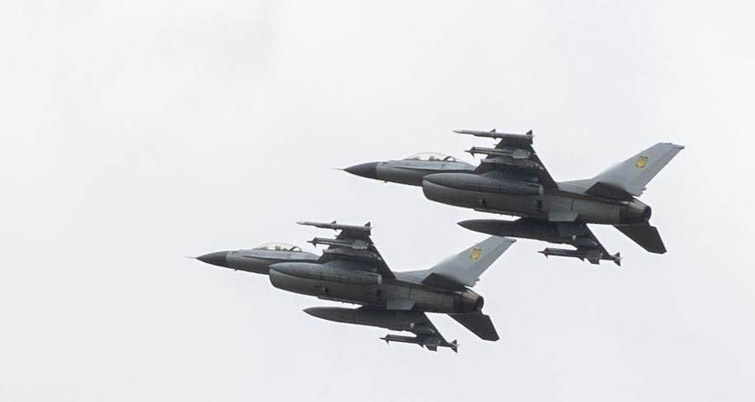
Ukrainian F-16s seen in 2025

On 17 August 2023, the United States approved the donation of F-16 fighters to Ukraine from Denmark and the Netherlands. The two countries subsequently announced their intention to supply Ukraine with 19 and 42 aircraft, respectively.

Norway had also announced its intention to donate F-16s to Ukraine in 25 August 2023, however, no numbers had been revealed. On 11 October, it was announced that Belgium will supply an undisclosed number of F-16 fighters to Ukraine.

The first batch of 18 F-16s from the Netherlands was announced on 22 December 2023. The aircraft were speculated to be delivered in the first half of 2024 according to Ukrainian Foreign Minister Dmytro Kuleba.

According to the Danish Defence Minister, Ukraine was set to receive the first F-16s in the summer of 2024, if the preparations proceeded accordingly. A previous statement by the Lithuanian Defence Minister Arvydas Anušauskas and an unnamed official, said that Ukraine could receive the first airplanes around June. This statement, although not officially confirmed, was not dismissed by Yurii Ihnat, the spokesman of the Ukrainian Air Force.

On 31 July 2024, it has been reported that a small number of F-16s arrived in Ukraine and had already flown their first combat missions in an air defence role. A report given by The Economist further added that Ukraine received a total of ten F-16s in the first batch and by the end of the year 20 F-16s should be in Ukrainian service with the rest of the aircraft delivered in 2025. In May 2025, the last F-16s, of the in total 24 donated by the Netherlands, flew over to Ukraine. On 4 August, President Zelenskyy presented the F-16s in Ukrainian service during a ceremony held at an unnamed base. The country which donated these jets was also not disclosed.

In an interview given earlier, in June, the head of the Ukrainian Air Force Sergiy Holubtsov stated that some Ukrainian F-16s will also be stored outside the country, likely in Poland and Romania, when in need of repairs and be kept as a reserve.

List of F-16 fighter jets pledged to Ukraine
Country	Quantity	Status	Notes
Belgium	30	Pending	Belgium pledged its jets in October 2023, with the specific number being disclosed in May 2024. The first batch of jets, originally slated for delivery in 2025, is expected to arrive in 2024.
Denmark	19	Partial delivery	Denmark announced in August 2023 its intention to deliver an initial six jets by the end of the year. This delivery was subsequently delayed to 2024. The first batch of six jets was delivered by November. The remaining 13 aircraft will be delivered in two batches, the first of which was delivered in December.
Netherlands	24	Delivered	The Netherlands announced in August 2023 its intention to deliver the jets, but did not specify the quantity. That December, the country began preparing an initial batch of 18 jets for delivery, with an additional six added in February 2024. The first batch of Dutch F-16s was delivered in October. The last Dutch F-16s were delivered in May 2025.
Norway	14	Delivered	Norway pledged to donate the jets in August 2023 and disclosed the specific number during the 2024 Washington summit. In a compliance report in accordance with the Arms Trade Treaty, Norway stated it had delivered 14 F-16s to Ukraine in 2024.
