= 114th Tactical Aviation Brigade =

Military unit of the Ukrainian Air Force

114th Tactical Aviation Brigade (2015–present) 114th Tallinn Red Banner Fighter Aviation Brigade (2002–2015) 114th Tallinn Red Banner Fighter Aviation Regiment (–2002)
- 114-та бригада тактичної авіації
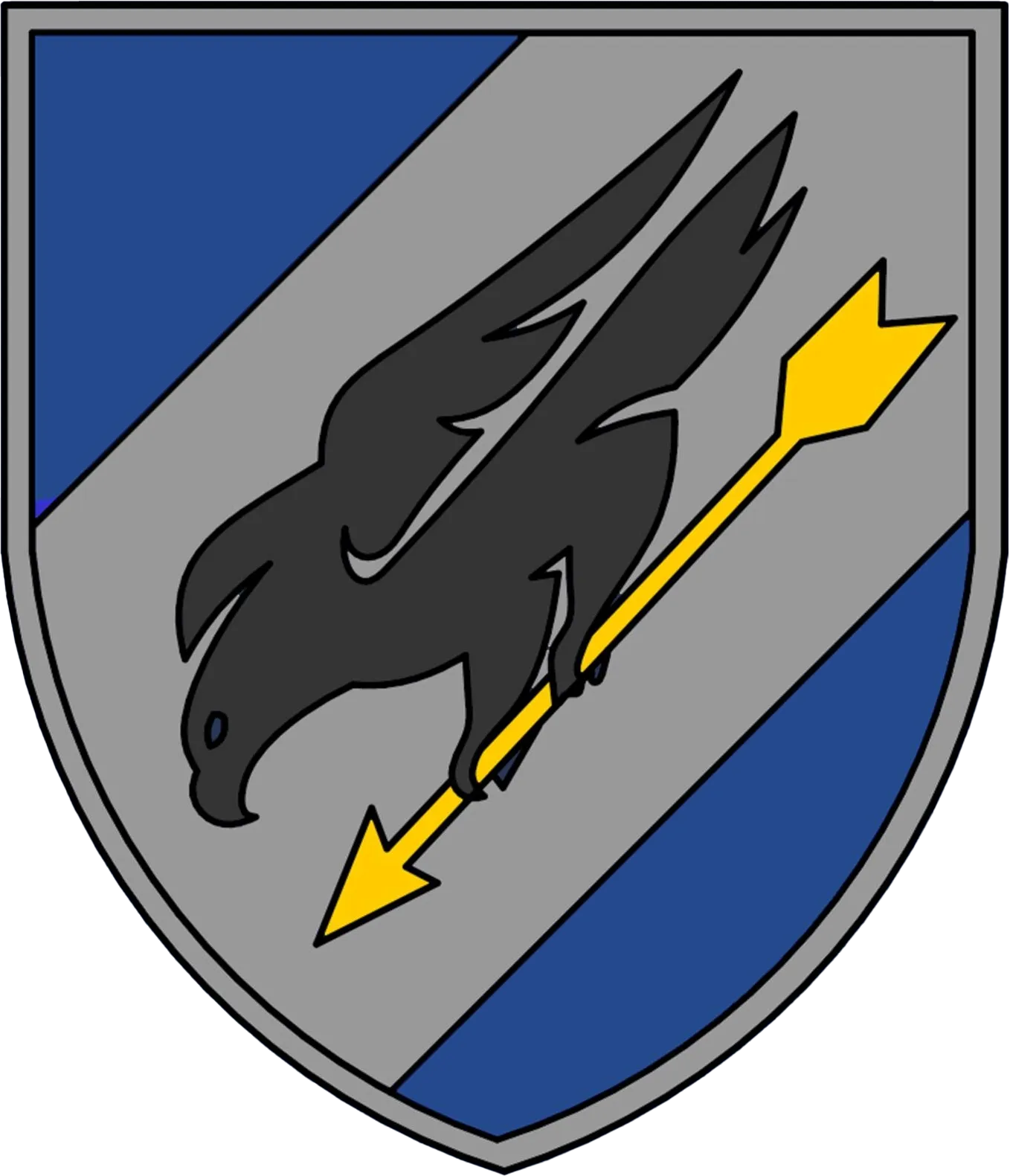
- Active: 1940 – present
- Country: Ukraine; Soviet Union (1940–1991)
- Allegiance: Armed Forces of Ukraine
- Branch: Ukrainian Air Force
- Type: Air Force Aviation
- Role: Fighter
- Size: Brigade
- Part of: Air Command West
- Garrison/HQ: Ivano-Frankivsk, Ivano-Frankivsk Oblast
- Motto: Higher than yourself
- Decorations: For Courage and Bravery
- Website: https://www.facebook.com/114brigade https://www.instagram.com/114tactical_aviation_brigade/?hl=en

Commanders
- Current commander: Evgeniy Karzhau

Insignia
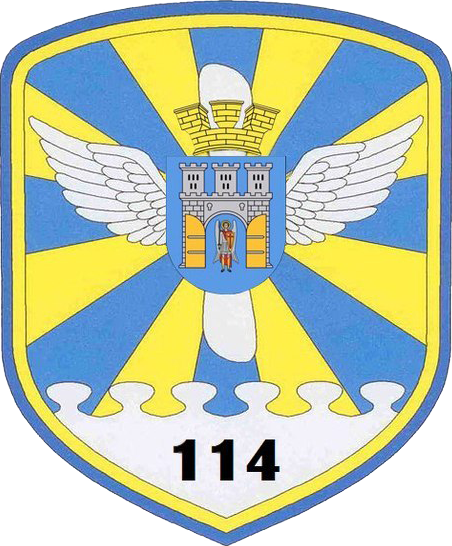
- Former sleeve patch

- Roundel

- Fin flash

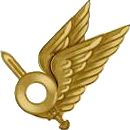
- Aviation branch insignia

Aircraft flown
- Fighter: MiG-29, MiG-29UB, MiG-29MU1
- Trainer: L-39

The 114th Tactical Aviation Brigade (MUN A1349) is a military unit of the Ukrainian Air Force. It's is composed of MiG-29 fighter aircraft.

== History ==
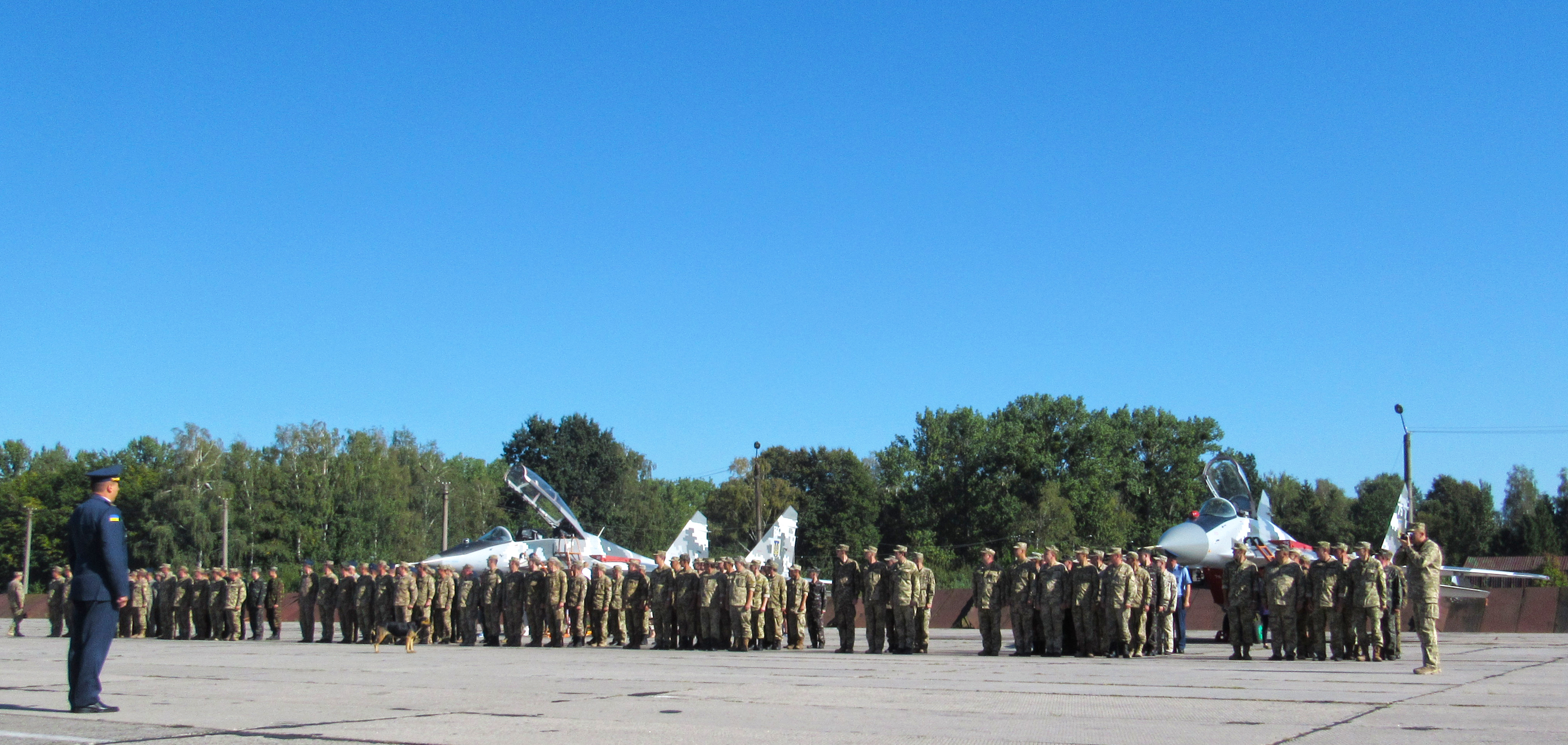
Line-up of personnel of the Brigade

January 21 (June) In 1991, the 114th Tallinn Red Banner Fighter Aviation Regiment of the Soviet Air Force was withdrawn from the city of Milovice, Czechoslovakia, where it was part of the Central Group of Forces. The regiment was armed with MiG-29 fighters. At that time, the 145th Fighter Aviation Regiment, also armed with MiG-29s, was based in Ivano-Frankivsk.

The personnel of the regiment swore allegiance to Ukraine on January 19, 1992.

In accordance with the directive of the Minister of Defense dated December 2, 2002, the 114th Fighter Aviation Regiment was merged with support units, resulting in the formation of a tactical aviation brigade.

Since December 1, 2005, the fighter aviation brigade has been on combat duty for the first time with the Ukrainian Air Defence Forces.

The flight crew is engaged in planned flight activities, and has repeatedly successfully performed flight tasks, flight-tactical exercises at Ivano-Frankivsk, Saky, Belbek, Lymanske, Lutsk, and Ozerne airfields.

In 2006, for the first time since 1993, the flight and tactical training of the aviation squadron was conducted, and finally, the aviation brigade participated in the command and staff training of the Air Force of the Armed Forces of Ukraine "Clear Sky". During these exercises, Major Serhiy Golubtsov made a training and combat sortie and forced a conditional violator of the state border to land at a designated airfield.

From March 12 to April 7, 2007, at the base of the fighter aviation brigade, a flight training session was held with the fighter aircraft of the United Rapid Response Forces of the Ukrainian Air Force in order to prepare for the class of fighter aircraft of the Air Force of the Ukrainian Air Force on MiG-29 aircraft for complex types of flight training.

In April 2007, the flight crew successfully completed the task of meeting with the aviation flight crew of the Ukrainian Air Force on ground targets.

On August 24, 2009, the aircraft of the 114th Brigade participated in the aviation part of the Independence Day Parade in Kyiv. In connection with the holding of UEFA Euro 2012, the MiG-29 (b/n 55) was on combat duty to cover the airspace of Ukraine during the football tournament.

In the second half of 2012, the MiG-29 (b/n 55) together with its "brother" MiG-29 (b/n 54) were repainted in blue-yellow camouflage colors and became the so-called "pseudo-Sokols." The planes were painted in these colors for a demonstration flight over the Hostomel Airport during the Aviasvit-XXI exhibition.

=== Russo-Ukrainian War ===
Since the beginning of the Russo-Ukrainian War in Donbas 2014, the entire personnel of the unit has been on combat duty. In the summer of 2014, a consolidated group was formed, which participated in combat sorties to strike at Russian separatist columns.

For a search zone flight, a typical load of the MiG-29 consisted of two outboard fuel tanks, two units of unguided C8 rockets, and sometimes, if the fuel supply allowed, a pair of RBC bomb cartridges. The first sorties of MiG-29s to isolate the area of hostilities were marked on August 5. In the Donetsk region, the search zones were designated in Yenakiieve, Shakhtarsk, and Amvrosiivka districts, and in Luhansk - around Luhansk.

To ensure an almost continuous presence in the search areas, the MiG-29 flew up to three sorties per day for each side (although not every day).

Despite this, separatists shot down the first MiG-29, bort number White 02, on August 7. The pilot safely ejected But there is still no accurate data about the MiG-29 (b/n 53) shot down on August 17 near Luhansk.

Airmen decorated for combat actions include:

- Lieutenant Colonel Mykola Mykolayovych Hayovchyk
- Colonel Dmytro Oleksandrovich Makarov
- Major Yakushevsky Oleksiy Viktorovych

On March 16, 2017, senior ensign Denega Vadym Vasyliovych tragically died in the area of the city of Sloviansk. On November 3, 2017, Nesterenko Anatoliyovych Valery died of a sudden heart attack.

On May 16, 2019, ensign Jus Vasyl Bogdanovych died during a two-sided battle from a fatal wound as a result of mortar shelling of the combat positions of the Ukrainian Armed Forces by terrorists near the village of Vodiane, Volnovakha Raion.

Technicians and mechanics of the brigade reported they are sometimes reassigned to infantry roles, serving in airborne assault troops, to protect the airfield, ever since 2014.

=== Full scale invasion ===
On June 2, 2023, Major Vladyslav Saveliev was conducting combat operations when his MiG was fatally hit by a Russian missile. Saveliev was killed. He used to train in Columbus, even before the war and was said to be one of the candidates to be trained on the F-16. in 2024 his name was engraved at Columbus Air Force Base next to his US-American comrades.

== Modernization ==
On June 24, 2012, the MiG-29MU1 (b/n) modernized at the Lviv State Aviation Repair Plant went to the 114th brigade.

On April 10, 2014, the 114th brigade received a repaired MiG-29 fighter (b/n 10).

On January 5, 2015, at the Ozerne airfield, President Poroshenko handed over 2 LDARZ repaired aircraft, MiG-29 (b/n 57) and MiG-29UB (b/n 86) to the Air Force for the 114th Tactical Aviation Brigade.

On December 30, 2015, the Lviv State Aviation Repair Plant handed over the overhauled MiG-29 fighter (b/n 71) to the 114th Tactical Aviation Brigade.

On March 29, 2016, the 114th Tactical Aviation Brigade received 4 MiG-29 front-line fighters (b/n 72, b/n 73, b/n 75, b/n 76) restored by the Lviv Aviation Repair Plant and 2 combat training aircraft L- 39 (b/n 72, b/n 123) restored by the Odesa Aviation Repair Plant.

== Structure ==
- 114th Tactical Aviation Brigade
  - Management (including headquarters)
  - 1st Aviation Squadron
  - 2nd Aviation Squadron
  - Aviation TECH
  - Battalion of communication and radio technical support:
    - Information and telecommunications node
  - Airfield maintenance battalion:
    - Technical company
    - Airfield operating company
    - Gas supply group
  - Company of material support
  - 128 Guard Company
  - Fire platoon
  - Medical center
  - Automobile Current

== Commanders ==
- Colonel Valentin Leonidovych Matyushenko (1988–1993);
- Colonel Bohdan Stepanovych Spodarko (1993–1995);
- Colonel Bastron Georgy Yehorovych (1995–1999);
- Colonel Petro Vasyliovych Granat (1999–2000);
- Colonel Serhiy Semenovych Drozdov (2000–2002);
- Lieutenant Colonel Vyacheslav Volodymyrovych Gromov (2002–2003);
- Colonel Oleksandr Oleksandrovych Kuharenko (2003–2006);
- Colonel Anatoly Mykolayovych Kryvonozhko (2006–2008);
- Colonel Serhiy Georgiyovych Bykhovets (2008 – November 17, 2011);
- Colonel Serhiy Mykolayovych Golubtsov (2011–2015);
- Colonel Yury Viktorovych Pohorilyy (2015–2018);
- Colonel Evgeniy Kadymovych Karzhau (since 2018)

== Traditions ==
On June 5, 2009, the brigade received the honorary name – the "114th Ivano-Frankivsk Tallinn Order of the Red Banner Tactical Aviation Brigade".

Since November 18, 2015, as part of the joint military reform, the honorary titles and awards of the Soviet period were removed. The brigade was renamed the 114th Tactical Aviation Brigade.

On August 24, 2022, the brigade was awarded the honorary award "For Courage and Bravery".

== Links ==
- Івано-Франківській бригаді тактичної авіації — 71 рік
- Військові частини Повітряних Сил за родами військ
- "Командир бригади тактичної авіації у Франківську: "До війни мали 3,5 години в рік нальоту. Зараз - мінімум 20". firtka.if.ua. Фіртка. 2017-05-11. Archived from the original on 28 January 2018.
- Командири 114 Івано-Франківської бригади тактичної авіації
