= 2023 Vilnius NATO summit =

NATO diplomatic conference in Lithuania

NATO Summit Vilnius 2023 Vilnius Summit•Sommet 11–12 VII 2023
- Host country: Lithuania
- Date: 11–12 July 2023
- Cities: Vilnius
- Venues: LITEXPO
- Follows: 2022 Madrid summit
- Precedes: 2024 Washington summit

The 2023 Vilnius summit was the formal meeting of the heads of state and heads of government of the thirty-one members of the North Atlantic Treaty Organization (NATO), their partner countries, and the European Union, held in Vilnius, Lithuania, on 11–12 July 2023. The summit was officially proposed during the previous 2022 Madrid summit and its dates were fixed on 9 November 2022. It was notable for the discussions about the ongoing Russian invasion of Ukraine as well as Sweden's and Ukraine's prospective memberships in the alliance.

== Background ==
The summit was held in the context of an ongoing Russian invasion of Ukraine. In his January 2023 address to the Lithuanian Parliament, President of Ukraine Volodymyr Zelenskyy described the summit as fateful. Ukraine expressed the desire to be formally invited to NATO at the Vilnius summit. On 8 July 2023, US President Joe Biden said that Ukraine is not ready to join NATO at that time. By the time of the summit there were 24 member states that had formally declared their support for Ukraine's NATO membership. Before the summit, on 4 July 2023, the former President of Lithuania Dalia Grybauskaitė criticized the Western leaders who failed to prevent the Russian aggression and said that the refusal to invite Ukraine to NATO would be a mistake.

Following the accession of Finland to NATO earlier in 2023, there had been an expectation among many NATO member states that Turkey and Hungary will complete the ratification process and allow the accession of Sweden before the summit. However, due to Turkish objections, it was unclear if Turkey would support Sweden's application by the time of the summit.

Australia, Japan, New Zealand and South Korea attended the summit to strengthen their ties with NATO due to increasing tensions with China and Russia.

== Security ==
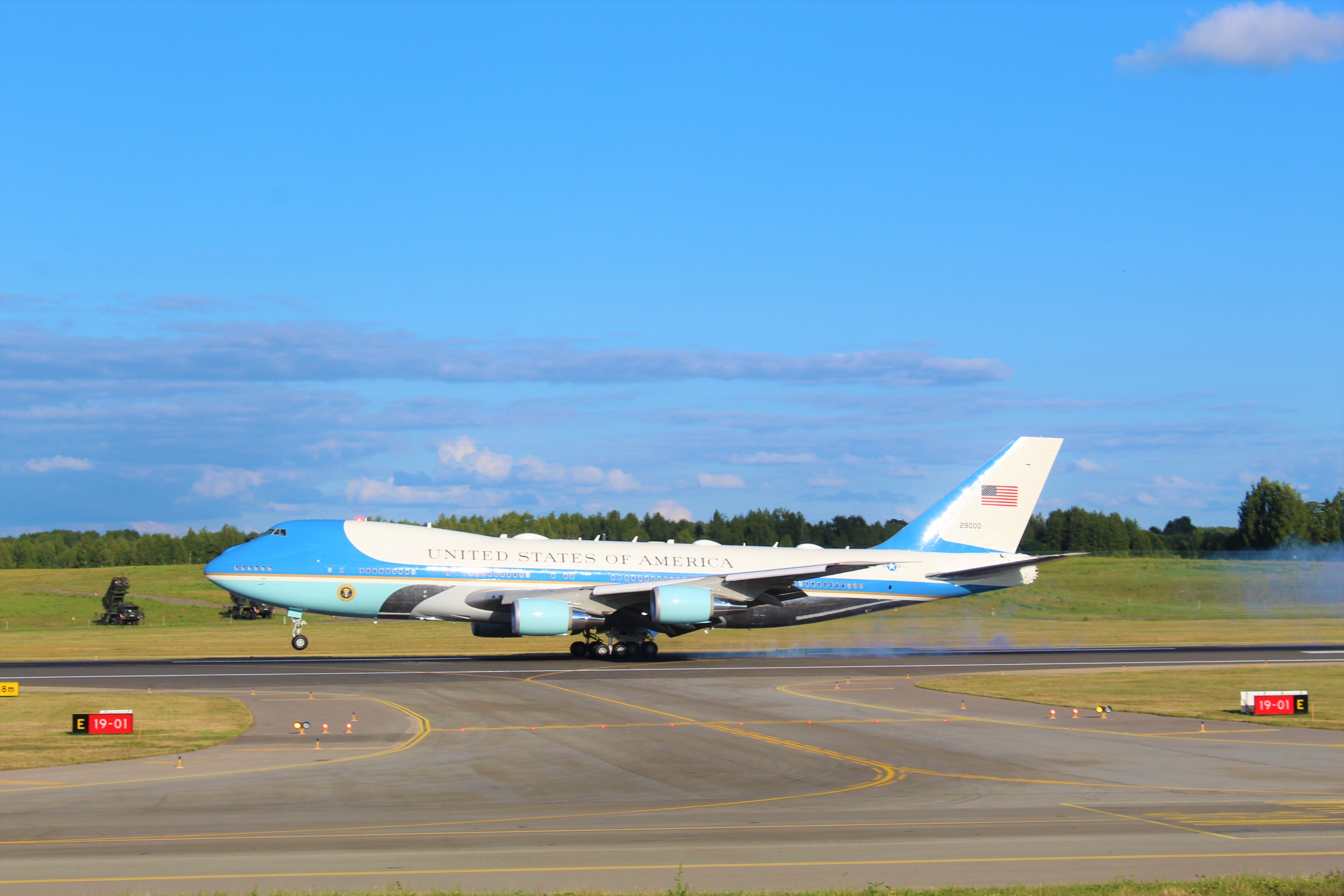
US Air Force One lands in Vilnius Airport. MIM-104 Patriot air defence systems visible in the background.

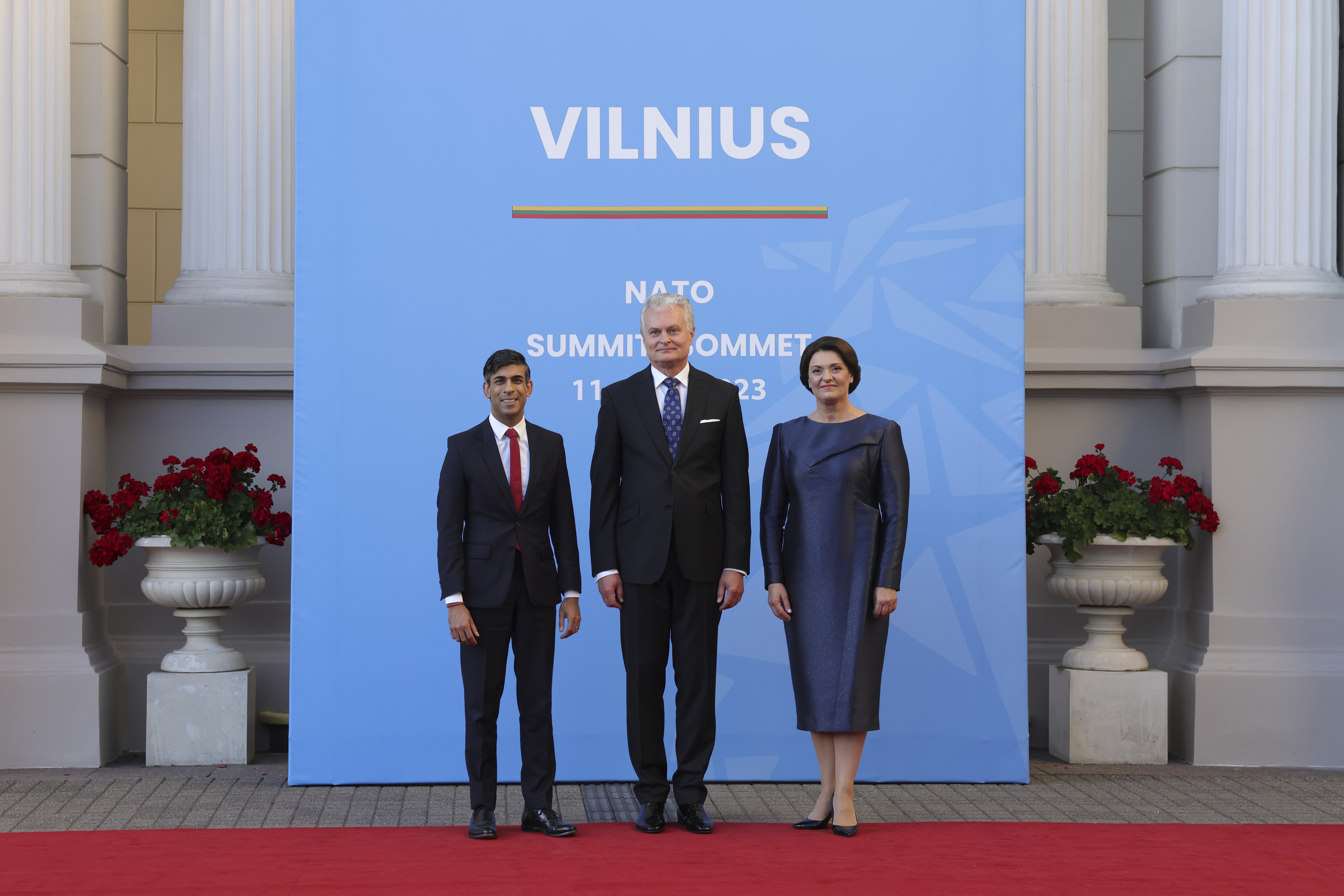
President of Lithuania Gitanas Nausėda and the First Lady of Lithuania meet UK Prime Minister Rishi Sunak

According to a representative of the Dignitary Protection Service of Lithuania, 40 heads of state and up to 150 other high-ranking officials will attend the summit and will require personal protection. To ensure the safety and security, Lithuania committed around 1,500 police officers, including the anti-terrorist unit ARAS and the Criminal Police Bureau, as well as over 3,000 troops of the Lithuanian Armed Forces. Additionally, police officers from Latvia and Poland aided in security and around 1,000 troops from NATO states additionally joined as well, including the Polish Special Forces to aid the Lithuanian Special Operations Force. Overall, up to 12,000 officers and soldiers were deployed. In addition to security personnel, Spain is reported to have temporarily moved its NASAMS air defense system from its long-term position in Latvia to Vilnius, in addition to Lithuania's own NASAMS systems. Similarly, German Armed Forces have deployed their MIM-104 Patriot long-range air defense system, placing it in Vilnius International Airport. NATO sent additional warships to the Baltic Sea. CBRN task force was also deployed.

The Lithuanian State Border Guard Service announced that, from 7 to 13 July, internal Schengen Area border control would be reinstated at Lithuania's border checkpoints with member nations Latvia and Poland, as well as its airports and seaports. For the duration of the event, as well as the days leading up to and after the event, many traffic restrictions were announced by the Vilnius City Municipality, including the closure of the entirety of the Vilnius Old Town and many parts of the city center for vehicles. Additionally, from 11 to 12 July, all flights over Vilnius and the surrounding airspace were prohibited and scheduled flights from Vilnius Airport were suspended. According to a representative of Lithuanian Airports, the other two civilian airports in Lithuania – Kaunas Airport and Palanga Airport – would continue to work but could experience delays.

== Summit ==
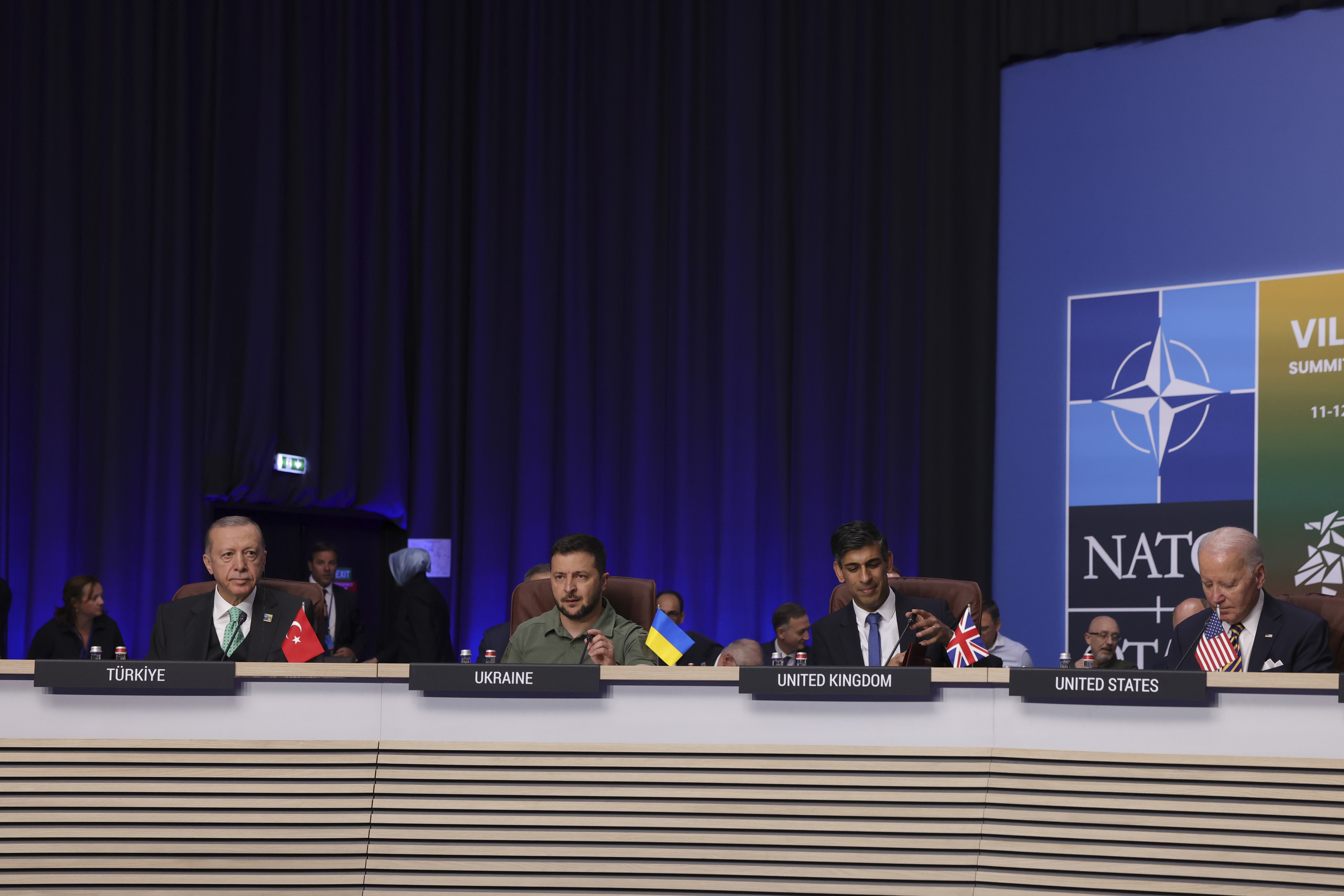
NATO–Ukraine Council

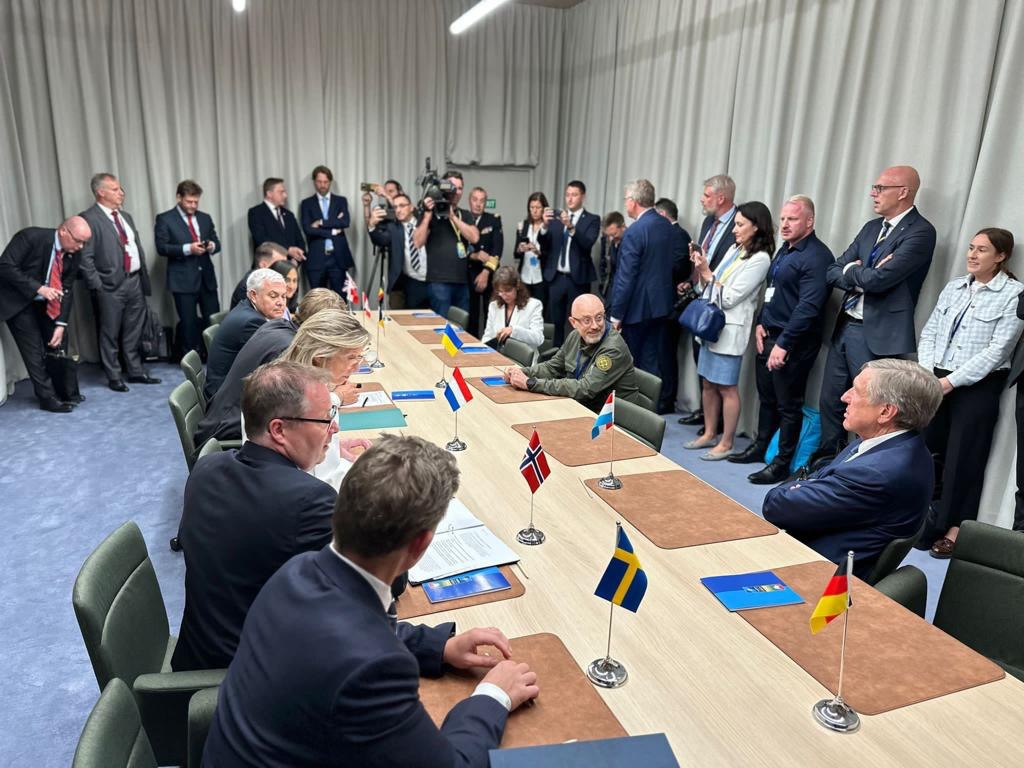
The signing of the F-16 training coalition memorandum

US President Joe Biden and a number of other leaders began arriving in Vilnius on Monday, the eve of the summit. In the evening, the Secretary General Jens Stoltenberg hosted a meeting between Turkish President Recep Tayyip Erdoğan and Swedish Prime Minister Ulf Kristersson. Following multiple hours of negotiations, Stoltenberg announced that Erdoğan agreed to unblock Swedish accession to NATO and ensure the ratification as soon as possible. Soon after the announcement, Hungarian Prime Minister, Viktor Orban, stated that Hungary would no longer block the entry of Sweden and would also support their membership into the defence bloc.

On 11 July, the three Baltic States (Estonia, Latvia and Lithuania) signed an agreement on joint airspace defense.

On 11 July, a memorandum was signed between 11 nations and Ukraine to form the F-16 training coalition. As part of the signed memorandum, Ukrainian pilots, technicians, and support personnel will participate in the training program. The coalition consisted of Canada, Belgium, Denmark, Luxembourg, the Netherlands, Norway, Poland, Portugal, Romania, Sweden, and the United Kingdom. According to the US Secretary of Defense Lloyd Austin, Denmark and the Netherlands took leadership of the formed coalition and the two nations are to outline the training plan.

Stoltenberg stated that Ukraine will not become a NATO member while the Russo-Ukrainian War remains ongoing and that the summit was not meant to be a formal invitation for it to join NATO, although countries remain divided on whether Ukraine should be able to join after the war ends. Ukraine's president Volodymyr Zelenskyy said that he wanted NATO to allow Ukraine to join as soon as possible after the war ends. However, other nations feared that such quick admittance of Ukraine to NATO could potentially increase Russian aggression and drag out the war even farther. Stoltenberg has also stated that he expects the summit to create a program of long-term aid over several years for Ukraine: "We have already pledged 500 million euros [US$548m] for critical needs, including fuel, medical supplies, de-mining equipment and pontoon bridges. We will also help build Ukraine's security and defence sector, including with military hospitals. And we will help Ukraine transition from Soviet-era to NATO equipment and standards."

Following the summit, Biden gave a speech at Vilnius University that touched on themes of unity between liberal democracies in the face of Russian aggression.

== Participants ==
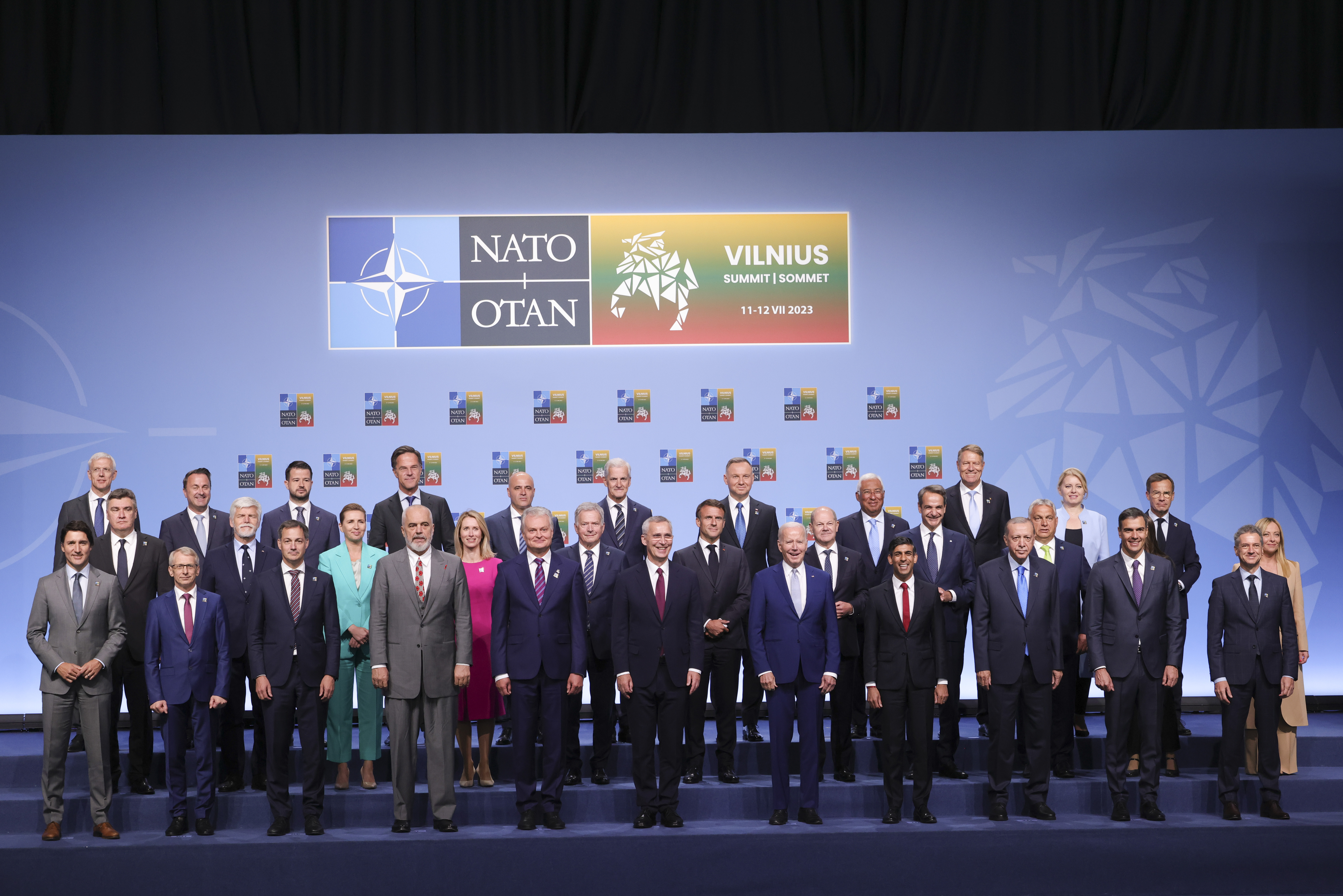
Family photo of the 2023 Vilnius summit

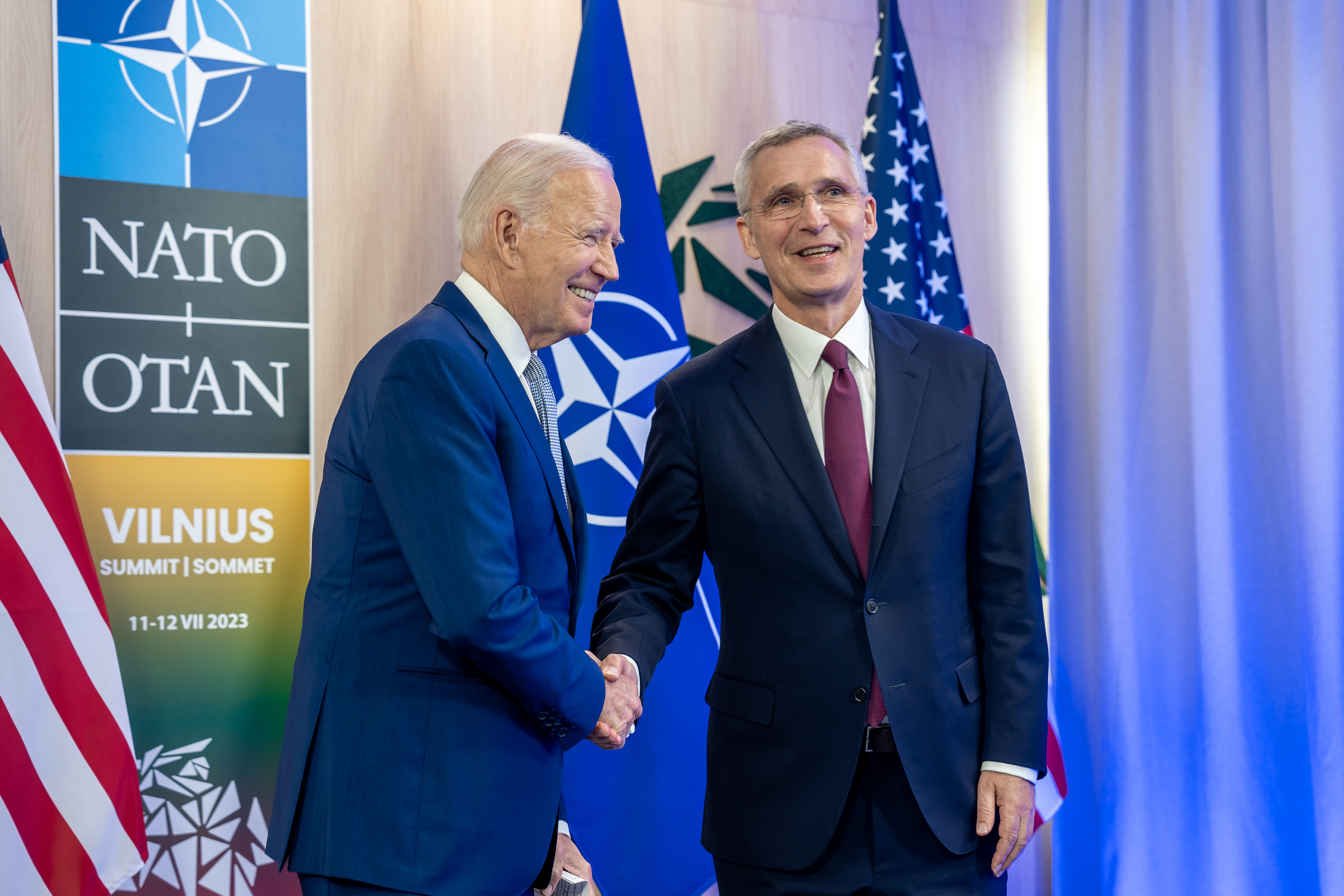
Joe Biden met with Jens Stoltenberg at the summit

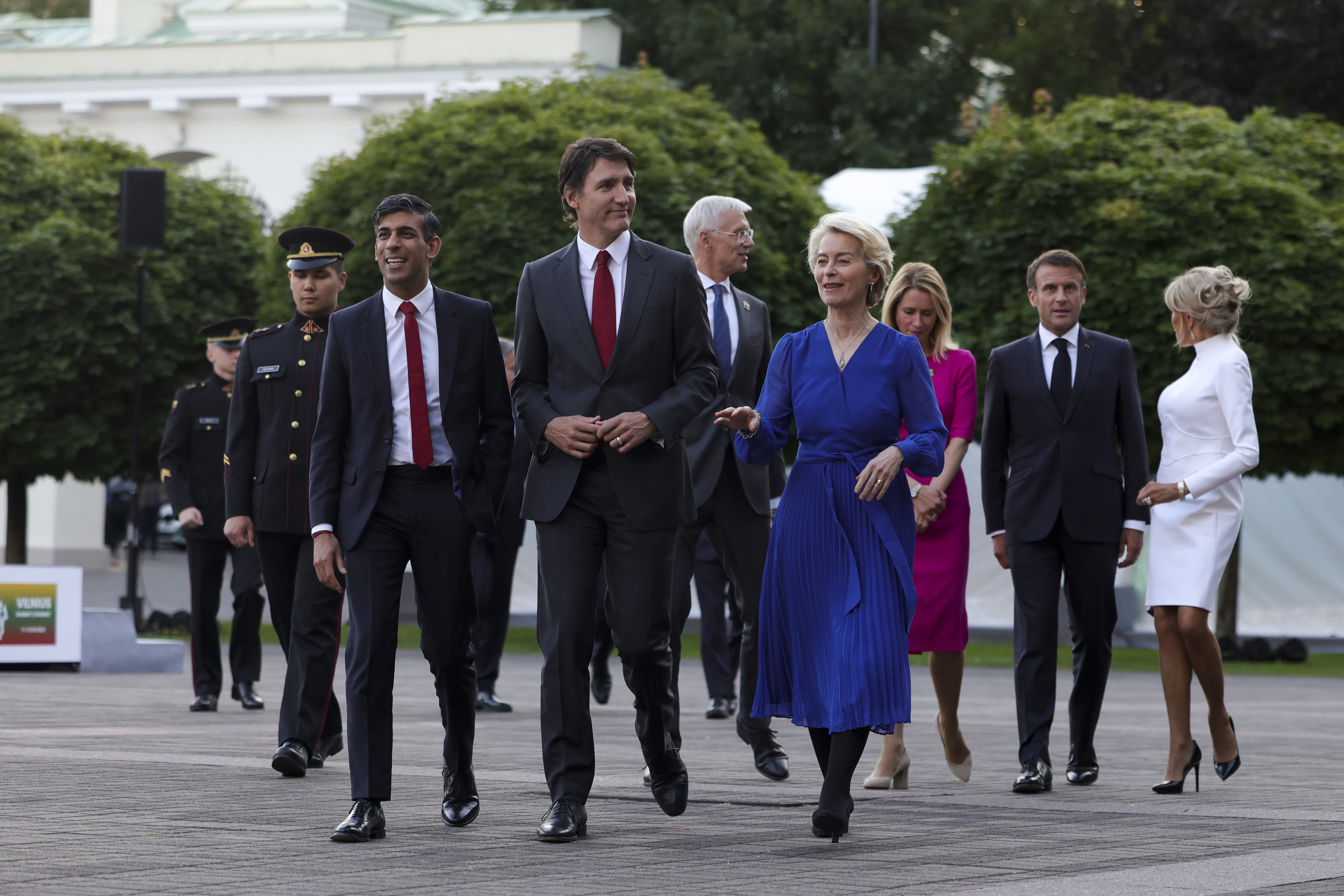
Participants of the summit attend the Lithuanian President's dinner

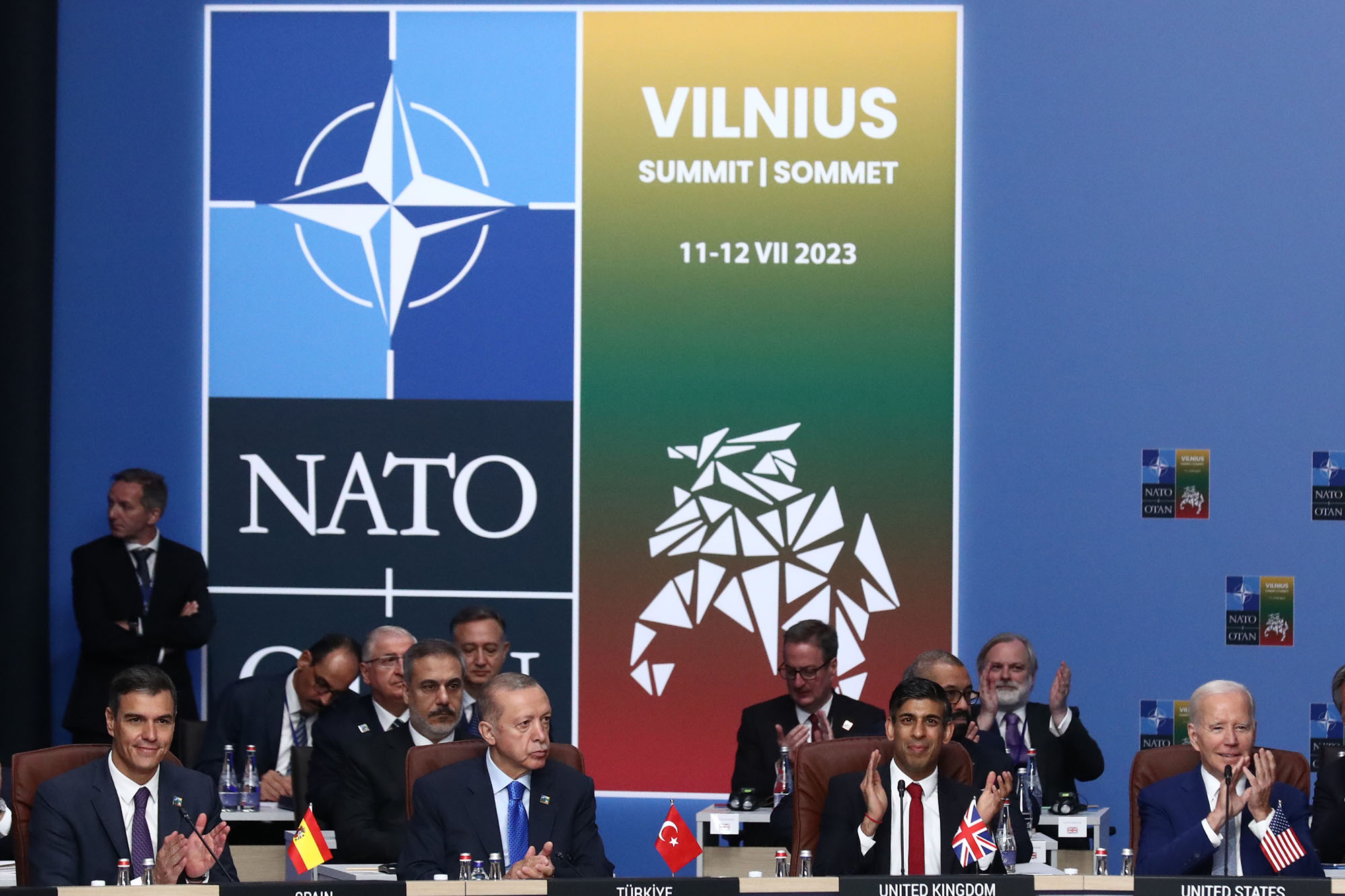
Spanish Prime Minister Pedro Sánchez, Turkish President Recep Tayyip Erdoğan and British Prime Minister Rishi Sunak

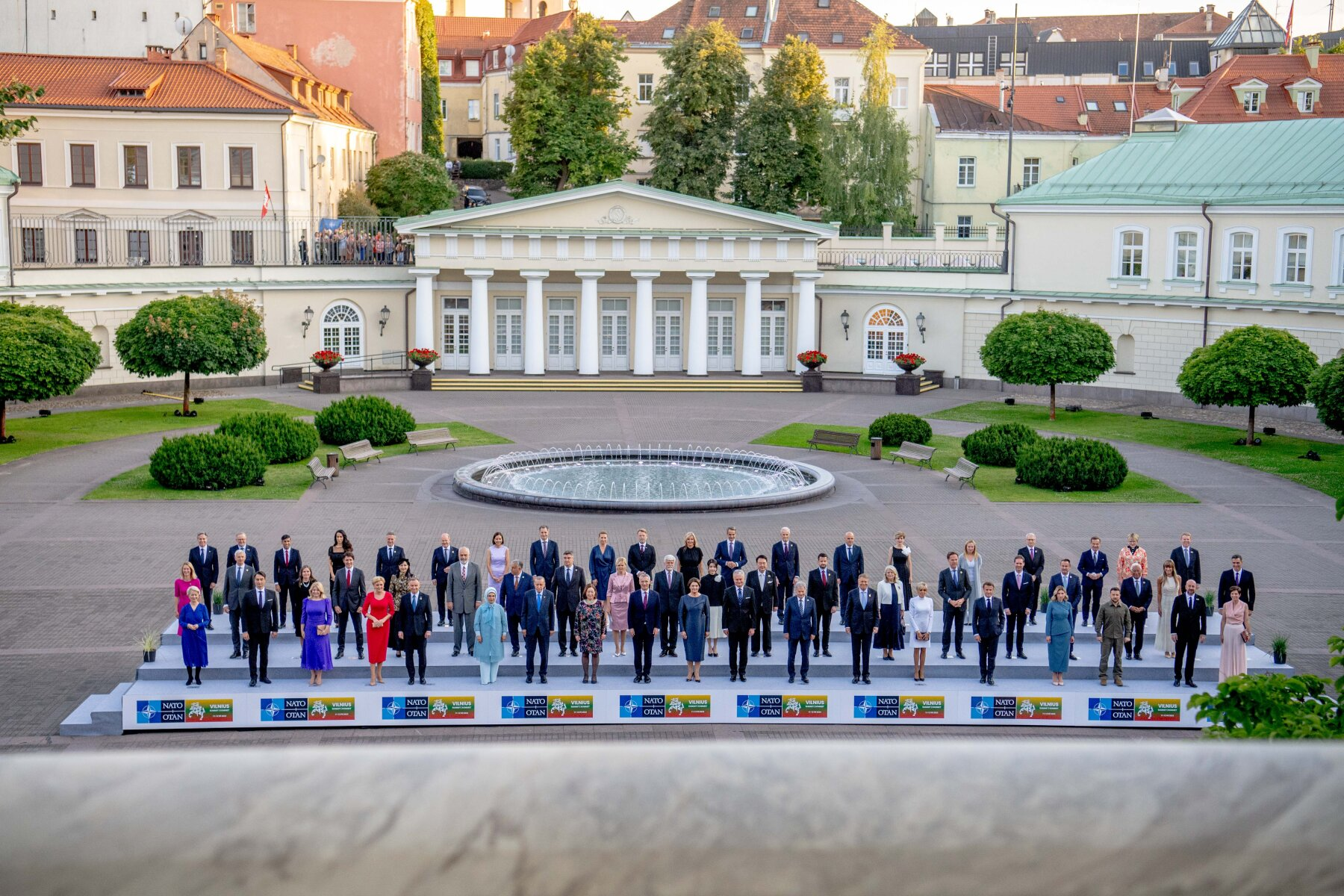
Guests of the Summit in the Courtyard of the Presidential Palace, Vilnius

Key
Non-NATO member

Country or organization	Head of Delegation	Title	Ref.
NATO	Jens Stoltenberg	Secretary General	
Albania	Edi Rama	Prime Minister	
Australia	Anthony Albanese	Prime Minister	
Belgium	Alexander De Croo	Prime Minister	
Bosnia and Herzegovina	Josip Brkić	Deputy Foreign Minister	
Bulgaria	Nikolai Denkov	Prime Minister	
Canada	Justin Trudeau	Prime Minister	
Croatia	Zoran Milanović	President	
Czech Republic	Petr Pavel	President	
Denmark	Mette Frederiksen	Prime Minister	
Estonia	Kaja Kallas	Prime Minister	
European Union	Charles Michel	Council President	
European Union	Ursula von der Leyen	Commission President	
Finland	Sauli Niinistö	President	
France	Emmanuel Macron	President	
Georgia	Ilia Darchiashvili	Foreign Minister	
Germany	Olaf Scholz	Chancellor	
Greece	Kyriakos Mitsotakis	Prime Minister	
Hungary	Viktor Orbán	Prime Minister	
Iceland	Katrín Jakobsdóttir	Prime Minister	
Italy	Giorgia Meloni	Prime Minister	
Japan	Fumio Kishida	Prime Minister	
Latvia	Krišjānis Kariņš	Prime Minister	
Lithuania	Gitanas Nausėda (host)	President	
Luxembourg	Xavier Bettel	Prime Minister	
Moldova	Nicu Popescu	Foreign Minister	
Montenegro	Jakov Milatović	President	
Netherlands	Mark Rutte	Prime Minister	
New Zealand	Chris Hipkins	Prime Minister	
North Macedonia	Dimitar Kovačevski	Prime Minister	
Norway	Jonas Gahr Støre	Prime Minister	
Poland	Andrzej Duda	President	
Portugal	António Costa	Prime Minister	
Romania	Klaus Iohannis	President	
Slovakia	Zuzana Čaputová	President	
Slovenia	Robert Golob	Prime Minister	
South Korea	Yoon Suk Yeol	President	
Spain	Pedro Sánchez	Prime Minister	
Sweden	Ulf Kristersson	Prime Minister	
Turkey	Recep Tayyip Erdoğan	President	
Ukraine	Volodymyr Zelenskyy	President	
United Kingdom	Rishi Sunak	Prime Minister	
United States	Joe Biden	President	

== Reactions ==
In a 12 July CNN interview, Boris Johnson, prime minister of the United Kingdom at the onset of the war, criticized the ambiguity about Ukraine's future membership and supported President Biden's decision to send cluster munitions to Ukraine.

British Secretary of Defence Ben Wallace made a remark that "we are not Amazon" and that Ukraine should show more thanks for international military aid. British Prime Minister Rishi Sunak, however, distanced himself from the comment and said that Ukrainians repeatedly expressed the gratitude.

== See also ==
- 49th G7 summit
- Government and intergovernmental reactions to the 2022 Russian invasion of Ukraine
