= Lviv strikes (2022–present) =

Airstrikes during the Russian invasion of Ukraine

- Part of the Russian invasion of Ukraine
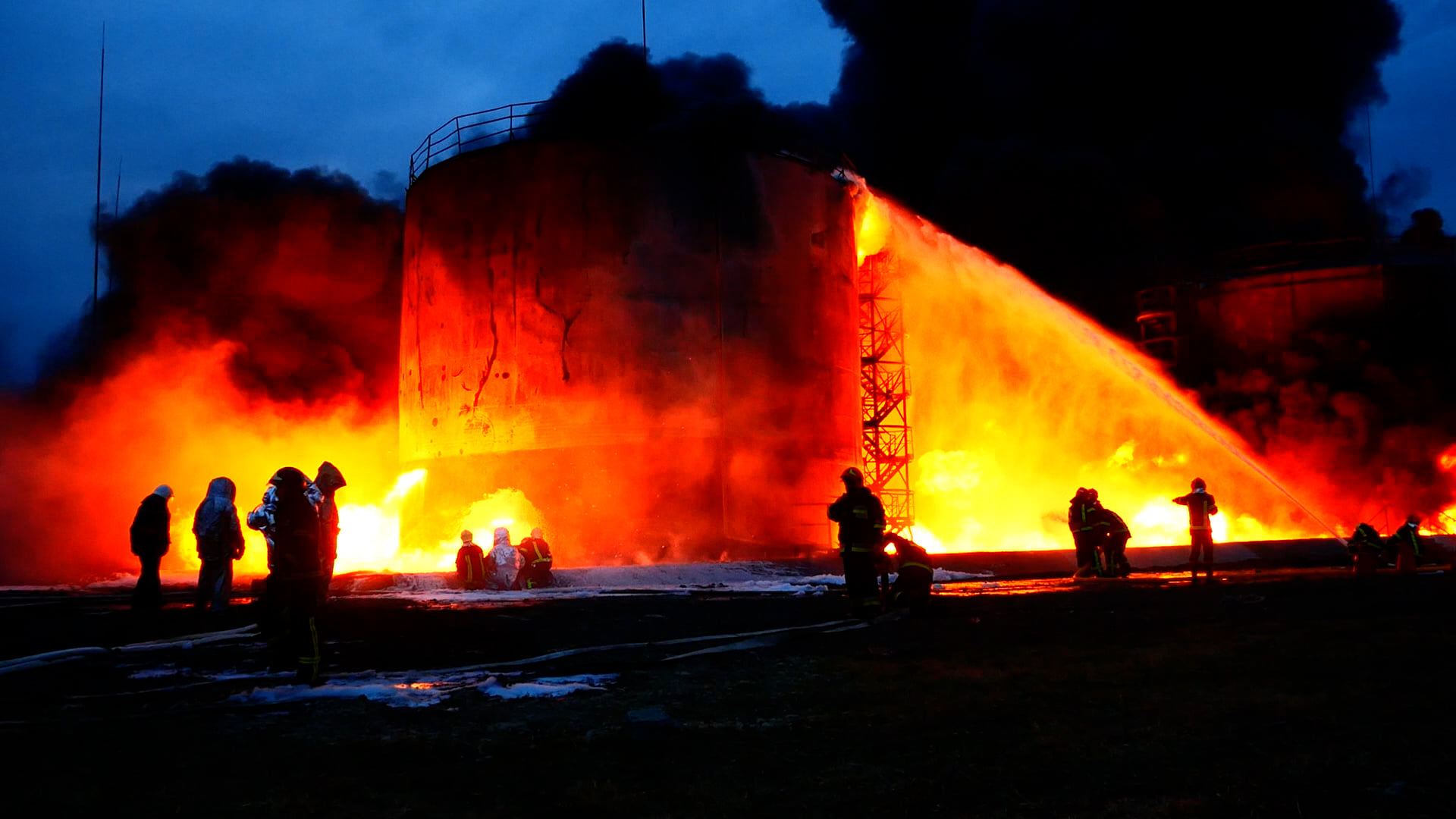
- The shelling of Lviv on 26 March 2022
| Date | 24 February 2022 – present (4 years, 5 months, 4 weeks and 1 day) |
| Location | Lviv Oblast, Ukraine |

Belligerents
| Russia | Ukraine |

Units involved
| Russian Armed Forces: Russian Air Force | Armed Forces of Ukraine: Territorial Defense Forces |

Casualties and losses
- at least 68 civilians dead and 276 civilians wounded

Since the beginning of the Russian invasion of Ukraine, Lviv and Lviv Oblast have been targeted by Russian attacks. The targets are civilian and military, including electricity, railway infrastructure, and an army base. At least 68 civilians have been killed.

== Timeline ==
=== 2022 ===
==== February ====
In Lviv Oblast, Russian troops attacked three military units around 07:30 on 24 February — in Brody, Novyi Kalyniv and Kamianka-Buzka.

==== March ====
On the morning of 13 March, Russian troops from the Black and Azov Seas launched an air strike on the Yavoriv military range. The planes took off from Engels-2 air base in the Saratov Oblast. In total, they fired more than 30 missiles, 8 of which hit the Yavoriv military range. As a result, according to the Lviv OMA, 35 people died and 134 were injured.

On the morning of 18 March, Russian forces fired six X-555 missiles at Lviv, aiming at the Lviv State Aircraft Repair Plant. Two missiles were intercepted and destroyed by Ukrainian air defense forces, the other four destroyed the plant building. One person was injured in the shelling.

At about 6 pm on 26 March, Russian troops launched a missile strike on an oil depot in the Velyki Kryvchytsi area, and a total of three explosions were recorded. A fire broke out, but no residential areas or other facilities were damaged. According to the head of the Lviv Oblast State Administration Maksym Kozytskyi, according to preliminary data, 5 people were injured.

Subsequently, at 8 pm, another rocket attack was carried out on the Lviv Armored Plant, which resulted in "quite serious damage." Andrii Sadovyi said that windows were broken in one of the schools near the place of impact. No one was injured. Later it became known that 2 missiles were fired at each of the objects, but the command of the Air Force of the Armed Forces of Ukraine says about 6 missiles fired at Lviv.

This activity of Russian troops was connected with the speech of US President Joe Biden in neighboring Poland, which took place immediately after the missile strikes.

On 28 March, the Air Defense Forces of Ukraine shot down three Russian missiles in Zolochiv Raion.

==== April ====
On 5 April, fighter jets tried to fire on civilian infrastructure in the Lviv Oblast from Belarus, but air defense forces shot down two missiles in Radekhiv.

On the morning of 16 April, the Russians launched missile strikes on the Lviv Oblast from Sukhoi Su-35 aircraft that took off from Baranovichi airfield from the territory of Belarus. Units of the anti-aircraft missile forces of the Air Command "West" of the Air Force of the Armed Forces of Ukraine destroyed four cruise missiles.

Fire after the missile attack at a service station on 18 April

On the morning of 18 April 2022, according to the West Air Command, there were four missile strikes in Lviv, including three strikes on military infrastructure, and one on tire fitting. As a result of the fire, there were fires, the objects were significantly damaged. According to the head of the Lviv OVA Maksym Kozytskyi, 7 people died and 11 people, including a child, were injured.

About 40 cars were damaged or destroyed in the tire assembly due to the rocket explosion.

At around 8:30 a.m., shots were fired at the traction substation of the "Krasne" railway station.

==== May ====
On 3 May, Lviv was shelled. Mayor Andrii Sadovyi stated that at least 5 explosions were known, three electrical substations were damaged in the city, and interruptions in the supply of electricity and water began in the part of the city. 2 people were injured.

4 rockets hit a military infrastructure facility in Yavoriv Raion, 15 km from Poland. Air defense shot down 2 more missiles. The rockets were launched from the Black Sea, probably from submarines.

On 17 May, Russian missile strikes targeted railway infrastructure in the village of Starychi in Yavoriv Raion. According to the Russian ministry of defense, the strikes destroyed a batch of Western military equipment. Three of the missiles were shot down by anti-aircraft defenses. Explosions were audible in the city of Lviv.

==== June ====
There was shelling of the railway infrastructure in Stryi Raion. Five people were injured.

Ukrainian air defense forces shot down a rocket over Zolochiv Raion. Debris damaged a brick factory. Six people were injured.

In Yavoriv Raion, the Russians launched a rocket attack on a military facility. Air defense managed to shoot down two cruise missiles. Four hit the target. As a result of the rocket attack, four people were injured.

==== August ====
The Lviv Oblast Military Administration (OMA) reported explosions in Radekhiv. Later, it became known that the target was a military unit in Chervonohrad Raion, and the Air Force Command of the Armed Forces of Ukraine clarified that the anti-aircraft missile complex was hit by a Russian missile.

==== October ====
On 10 October 15 rockets were launched in the Lviv Oblast, 7 of which were shot down by air defense forces. The remaining targets of the rockets were objects of the city's critical infrastructure, the Russian mass media reported that one of the targets of the attack was the Lviv CHP-1. Almost the entire city was left without electricity and water supply, and there was also a problem with mobile communication. By the morning of the next day, electricity was restored almost everywhere.

On 11 October 3 strikes were made on the energy infrastructure of Lviv, as a result of which 30% of the city, mostly in the Sykhivskyi and Frankivskyi districts, remained without electricity. 1 person was injured.

On 13 October 6 rockets were fired over the territory of Lviv Oblast, 4 of which were shot down by air defense forces. The targets of the remaining 2 missiles were a military facility in Zolochiv Raion.

On 22 October, several Russian missiles were shot down over Lviv Oblast.

==== November ====
A Shahed 136 kamikaze drone was shot down over Lviv Oblast.

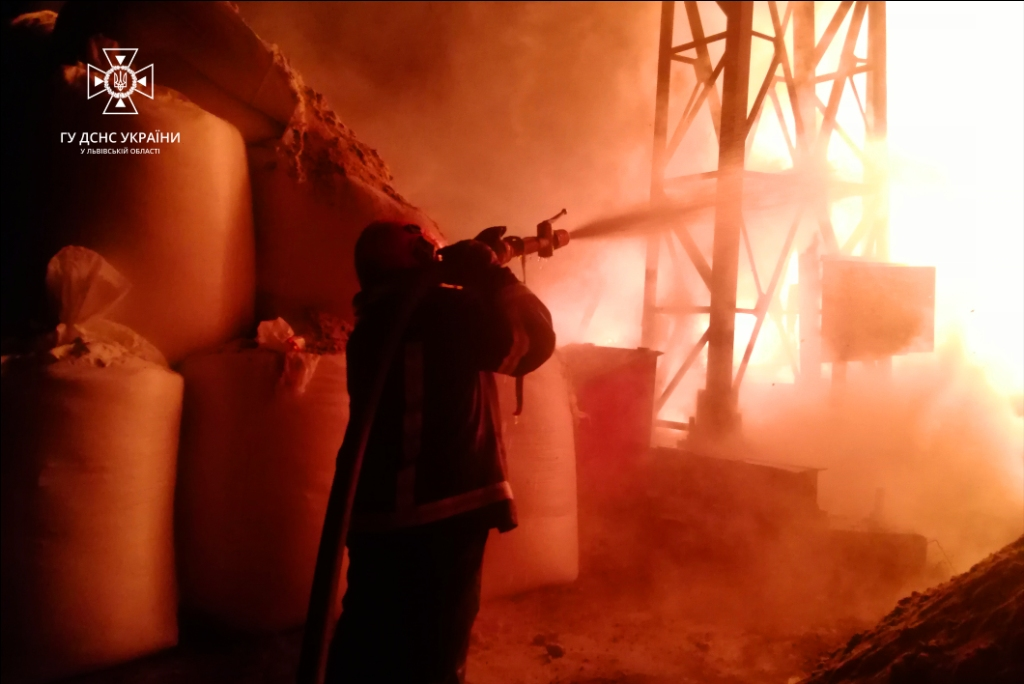
Extinguishing fires after Russian missile strikes on energy infrastructure facilities in Lviv Oblast on 15 November 2022.

Lviv Oblast was attacked by more than 10 Russian missiles, most of which were shot down by air defense forces. Those that remained hit 3 "objects of critical infrastructure". 80% of Lviv, as well as parts of Yavoriv, Zolochiv and Chervonohrad raions, remained without electricity and heating. There were interruptions with connection, mobile Internet and water supply. As a result of the shelling, one person was hospitalized with serious injuries.

On 23 November, two missile strikes were recorded at an electrical substation in Lviv Oblast, a while after the air alert was announced on the entire territory of Ukraine. At 15:07, Lviv and the Oblast were completely out of power. Yavoriv Raion and Chervonohrad Raion also remained without electricity. In Lviv, trams and trolleybuses temporarily stopped running. 70% of traffic lights in the city were out of order. Emergency power outages were applied throughout the region. In Lviv, no rocket strikes have been confirmed on the territory of the city. According to the information of the Governor of Lviv Oblast, Maksym Kozytskyy, a total of 5 rockets have been fired towards the Lviv Oblast, 3 of which were successfully taken down by the air defence systems.

==== December ====
On 29 December, the Russians launched six rockets towards the Lviv Oblast, four of which were shot down by air defence forces. There were two hits on a power substation.

=== 2023 ===
==== January ====
On 14 January, an energy infrastructure facility in Lviv Oblast was hit, causing a fire. Air defence forces shot down one missile.

==== February ====
On 10 February, another missile attack was launched against the Lviv Oblast. Air defence forces shot down nine missiles over the region, but there were also hits. One missile hit an energy infrastructure facility, another fell near a bus stop in a village in Zolochiv Raion without detonating. Another fell near a sanatorium in Lviv Raion. The blast wave smashed some of the windows in the building.

On 16 February, at night, three Russian missiles hit a non-energy infrastructure facility near Drohobych. The resulting fire was extinguished. A shop wall collapsed on a neighbouring street, and windows were smashed in a nearby gymnasium.

==== March ====
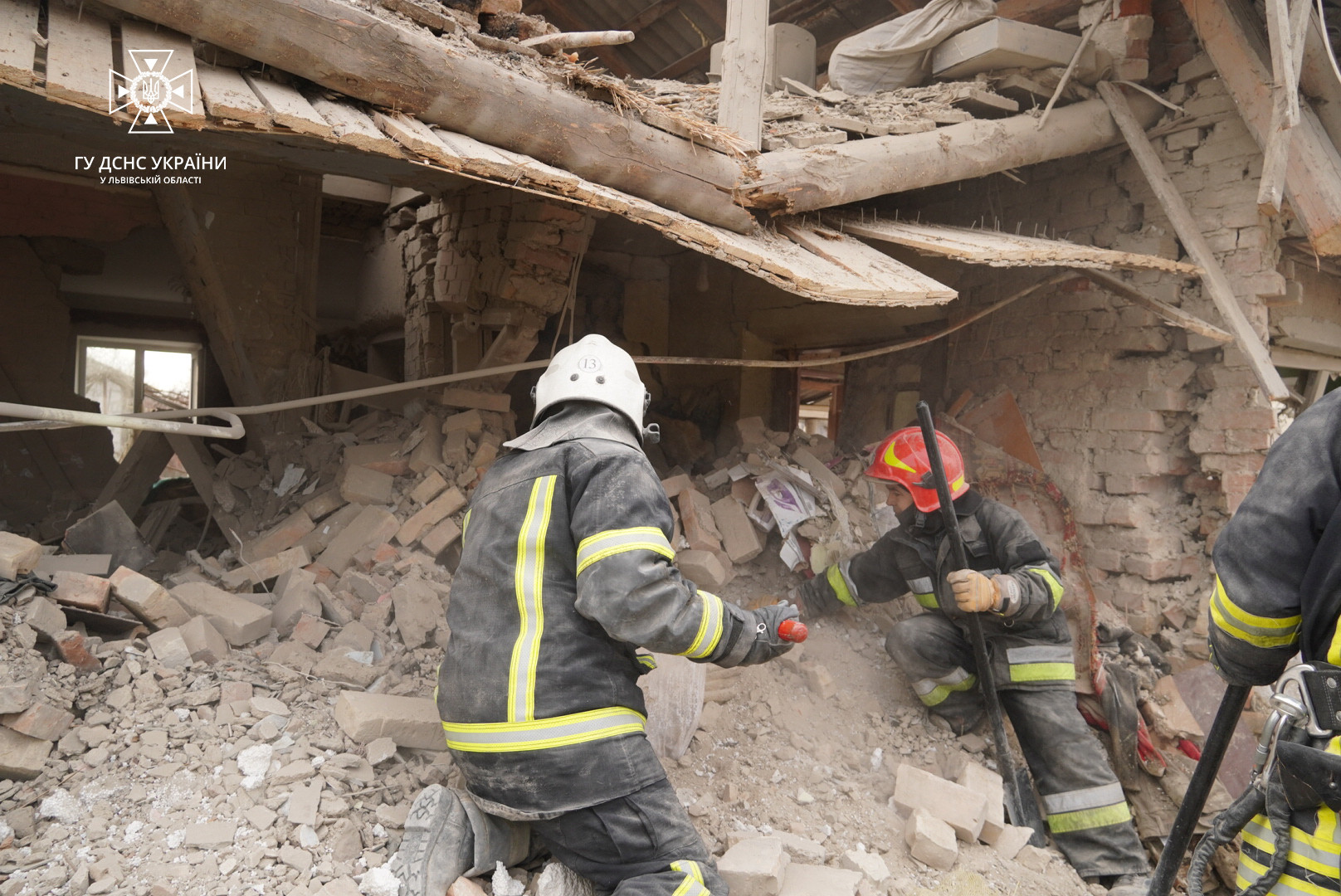
State Emergency Service of Ukraine eliminates the consequences of a Russian missile attack on 9 March 2023

On 9 March, during a missile strike on Ukrainian territory, one Russian missile fell on a residential area in the village of Velyka Vilshanytsia, Zolochiv Raion. The resulting fire destroyed three residential buildings, three cars, a garage and several outbuildings. Five people were killed.

==== June ====
On 20 June, critical infrastructure was hit in the center of Lviv. No fatalities were reported.

==== July ====
On 6 July 10 residents were killed with at least 42 injured in a missile strike on an apartment that took place early in the morning in Lviv. The Governor of Lviv Oblast also confirmed that a "critical infrastructure facility" was struck, while a house was damaged by missile debris in Zolochiv. The mayor of Lviv called it the "largest attack on civilian infrastructure“ in the city since the start of the invasion.

==== September ====
On 19 September, Russia launched an early morning drone attack on Lviv, killing one person, injuring another and setting fire to a warehouse.

=== 2024 ===
==== January ====
On 1 January 2024, a museum in Lviv about the UPA commander-in-chief Roman Shukhevych was set on fire by a Russian drone. Another drone damaged the building of the Lviv National Agrarian University.

==== March ====
On 24 March, "critical infrastructure" in Lviv Oblast was targeted by 20 missiles and seven drones, with at least "two" strikes causing a fire.

On 31 March, two people were killed in Lviv Oblast as Russia launched a series of overnight airstrikes on Ukrainian energy infrastructure facilities, which according to Russian officials were connected to the manufacture and repair of military equipment.

==== April ====
On 27 April, Russian attacks severely damaged equipment at a thermal power plant in Lviv Oblast, causing blackouts.

==== June ====
On 22 June, a missile hit an energy facility in Lviv Oblast, starting a fire.

==== September ====
Destructions in Lviv after the attack on 4 September

On 4 September, at least seven people were killed and 64 others were injured by Russian airstrikes. The strikes targeted residential buildings and the area around the main Lviv railway station.

==== November ====
On 17 November, one person in Lviv was killed as critical infrastructure in the oblast was attacked amidst a large-scale Russian air attack on Ukrainian cities.

=== 2026 ===
==== January ====
On the night of 8 January, 2026, Russian forces launched Oreshnik missiles from Kapustin Yar test site that struck Lviv, the first time Lviv Oblast was hit by a ballistic missile during the Russo-Ukrainian War.
