= Sergiy Holubtsov =

Ukrainian general

Sergiy Holubtsov (Ukrainian: Сергій Миколайович Голубцов) was the head of the Ukrainian Air Force as of August 2023.

== Career ==
In 2006 Golubtsov was ranked a Major and attached to the 114th Tactical Aviation Brigade (Ukraine).

On 20 March 2023 Golubtsov said that the UAF's best pilots were dying as they wait for the F-16 to appear. By April 2023 Golubtsov was ranked a Colonel and was head of aviation in the Ukrainian Air Force. In April 2023 Golubtsov said that the F-16 platform was four or five times better than the ex-Soviet platforms in use by the PSZSU; at the same time Poland and Slovakia announced that they would supply surplus MiG-29s to Ukraine. Experts consider that the F-16 armed with the AIM-120D should outmatch Russian aircraft. Holubtsov asked for foreign pilots to fly Ukrainian combat missions as part of the International Legion (Ukraine), and he said that preliminary experience with PSZSU pilots who know English indicated that the training school could be compressed from the six months initially rumoured, however the Americans remained unconvinced.

By May 2023 Golubtsov was ranked a Brigadier General and had been promoted Chief of Aviation of the Air Force Command. In May 2023 Golubtsov requested three or four squadrons of 12 to 16 F-16 fighters in order to achieve air superiority over Ukraine.

As of August 2023, the UAF had flown 14,000 combat air sorties since the invasion began on 24 February 2022. Golubtsov said then that he expected the training of F-16 pilots to be complete in twelve months' time. The PSZSU faced uncertainty and delay due to ambivalent allies. The Ukrainian F-16 pilots would be trained in batches of six to eight students. The F-16 combat course would last six months. Holubtsov said that his pilots are instructed in the English language as part of their professional curriculum. Romania was expected to host the F-16 school in Europe. As of August, defence minister Oleksiy Reznikov had been able to collect the signatures of 11 countries on his Air Force for Ukraine coalition memorandum: Denmark, the Netherlands, Belgium, Canada, Luxembourg, Norway, Poland, Portugal, Romania, Sweden, and Great Britain.

On 9 June 2024 Golubtsov said that the PSZSU would soon begin testing guided air bombs, similar to the Russian FAB 500, produced in Ukraine. The spare Ukrainian F-16s will be kept in reserve on NATO territory and will be used as much as possible to train PSZSU pilots. Said Holubtsov: "We are also currently working on re-equipping and creating our own guided bombs on the basis of conventional free-fall bombs. There are some design nuances, we need to select a wing, a GPS module, and a control module. In a few weeks, we are going to start the first tests of the first batches of such bombs, which are Ukrainian."
