= Lviv State Aviation Repair Plant =

Ukrainian state enterprise

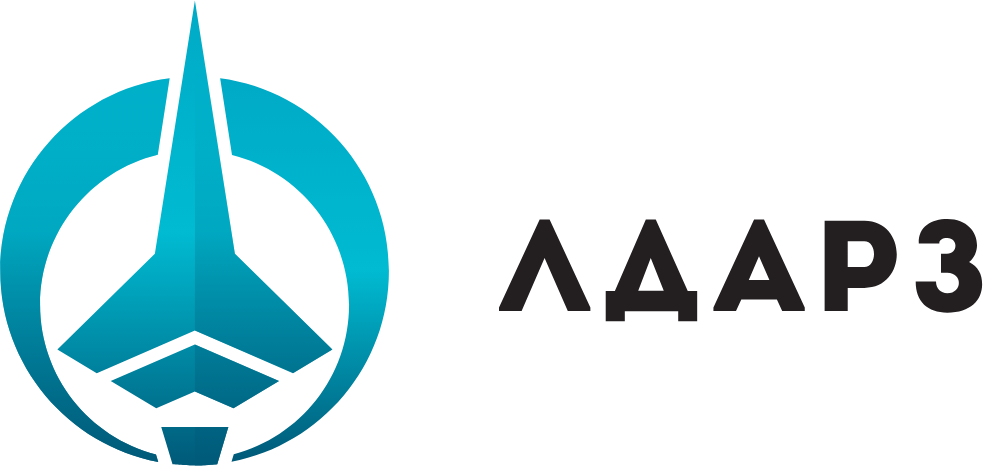

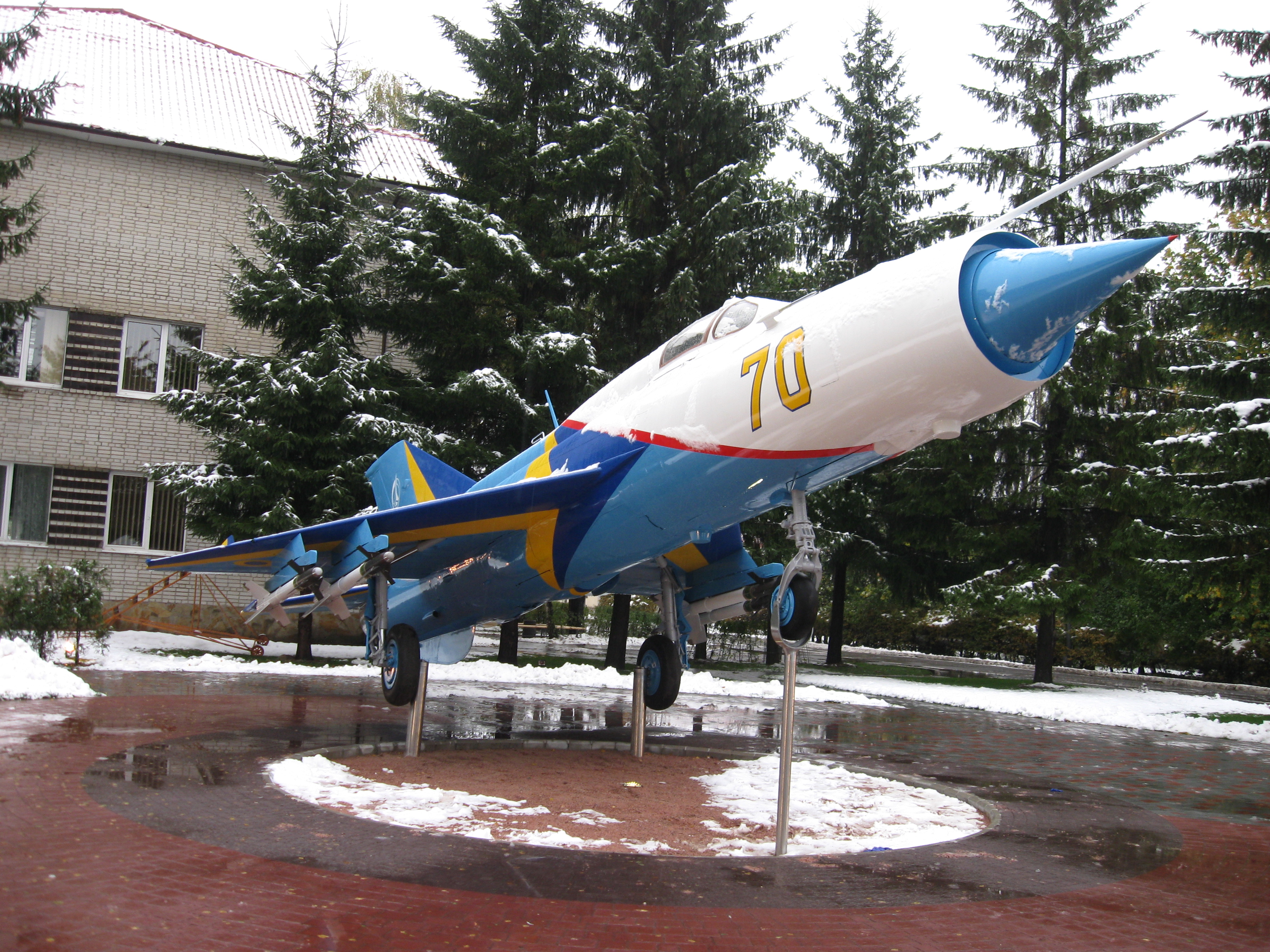
- MiG-21 monument at the entrance to the plant
- Type: State Enterprise
- Genre: repair of military aviation equipment
- Predecessor: 352nd Aviation Repair Base
- Founded: 1939
- Headquarters: Aviatsiina St, 3, Lviv, Lviv Oblast, Ukraine, 79040
- Key people: Matrunchyk Dmytro Mykolayovych
- Number of employees: 912
- Parent: Ukroboronprom
- Website: https://lsarp.business.site/

The Lviv State Aviation Repair Plant (Львівський Державний авіаційно-ремонтний завод, abbreviated as LDARZ) is an aircraft repair plant of the Ukrainian Defense Industry. It was founded on October 15, 1939, in Lviv. The factory specializes in repairing the Mikoyan MiG-29 jet fighter.

== History ==
On 15 October 1939, in Lviv, in the former hangars of the 6th Aviation Regiment of the Polish Air Force, the 133rd Stationary Aviation Repair Workshops (SAM) were created, tasked with repair and maintenance of Soviet Air Force aircraft based in the western region of the Soviet Union. The workshops used the equipment of the former Polish unit to repair captured Polish aircraft and engines, as well as Soviet aircraft such as the Po-2, I-15, I-16, and I-153. Vehicles, motorcycles and tractors were also repaired in the workshops.

Until 1953, the 133rd SAM carried out the repair of aviation equipment that was in service with the Red Army:

- Polikarpov I-15
- Polikarpov I-153
- Polikarpov I-16
- Polikarpov Po-2
- Tupolev SB-2
- Tupolev TB-3
- Lisunov Li-2
- Mikoyan-Gurevich MiG-3
- Lavochkin-Gorbunov-Gudkov LaGG-3
- Lavochkin La-5
- Lavochkin La-9
- Yakovlev Yak-3
- Yakovlev Yak-7
- Yakovlev Yak-9
- Ilyushin Il-10
- Tupolev Tu-2
- Douglas A-20 Havoc

At the beginning of World War II, the 133rd SAM became part of the Southwestern Front. The workshops were evacuated to Poltava and then to Penza. They were located in Kuznetsk from 3 October 1941. After the liberation of Lviv, the 133rd SAM returned to its previous base aboard trains beginning in September 1944.

During the war, the workshops repaired 1,287 aircraft and 2,820 aircraft engines, as well as significant quantities of aviation weapons, radios, and special equipment. Between November 1944 and May 1945, the 133rd SAM assembled 800 new Ilyushin Il-10 ground attack aircraft from components obtained from aircraft factories.

In September 1946, the 133rd SAM was renamed the 272nd Aviation Repair Base (ARB). On 15 May 1947, the 272nd ARB was renumbered the 352nd ARB. The base received a new status and became the 117th Aviation Repair Factory on 1 January 1953.

The initial stage of the enterprise's work – the repair of first-generation aircraft (piston aircraft) – concluded in 1953, after which the repair of 16 different types of aircraft was mastered. The era of jet aircraft repair began at the factory in 1953. The plant's aviation specialisation was selected to be light front-line fighters and fighter-bombers of the "MiG" type. The MiG-15 aircraft became the plant's "firstborn" jet.

From 1953 to 1979, the plant repaired second-generation aircraft:

- Mikoyan-Gurevich MiG-15
- Mikoyan-Gurevich MiG-17
- Mikoyan-Gurevich MiG-21

all modifications.

Since 1979, the plant has been repairing MiG-23 and MiG-27 aircraft of all types. The facility upgraded MiG-27 aircraft into MiG-27D aircraft between 1983 and 1989. The tenth thousandth jet aircraft was repaired at the factory in 1989. The development of the repair of fourth-generation aircraft – the MiG-29 aircraft in various modifications – began in 1992. In the same year, the facility was renamed Lviv State Aviation Repair Plant (LDARZ) and was designated as a State Enterprise of Ukraine's Ministry of Defence.

=== During the Russo-Ukrainian war ===
On 18 March 2022, four cruise missiles hit the plant. According to Lviv Mayor Andriy Sadovyi, his building was destroyed in the attack. The plant's active operations were prematurely halted. There were no victims, but there was one wounded.

On 8 January 2026, according to the Russian Ministry of Defense, an Oreshnik missile struck the plant.

== Present day ==
Currently, the company performs:

- Repair of MiG-21, MiG-23, MiG-27, and MiG-29 aircraft, their units, and equipment, including the entire complex of works to restore the interrepair resource and service life;
- repair of airframe units and systems;
- development and supply of technological documentation for mastering the repair of airframe units and systems;
- manufacture and supply of non-standard technological equipment developed by the company's specialists for the repair of aviation equipment.

== Sources ==
- Офіційна сторінка Львівського державного авіаційно-ремонтного заводу
- "ЛДАРЗ передав ЗСУ два модернізованих винищувача МіГ-29МУ1". www.ukrmilitary.com/. Ukrainian Military Pages. 2018-08-01. Archived from the original on 1 August 2018.
