= Khmelnytsky's campaign of 1648 =

Events during the Khmelnytsky Uprising

- Part of the Khmelnytsky Uprising
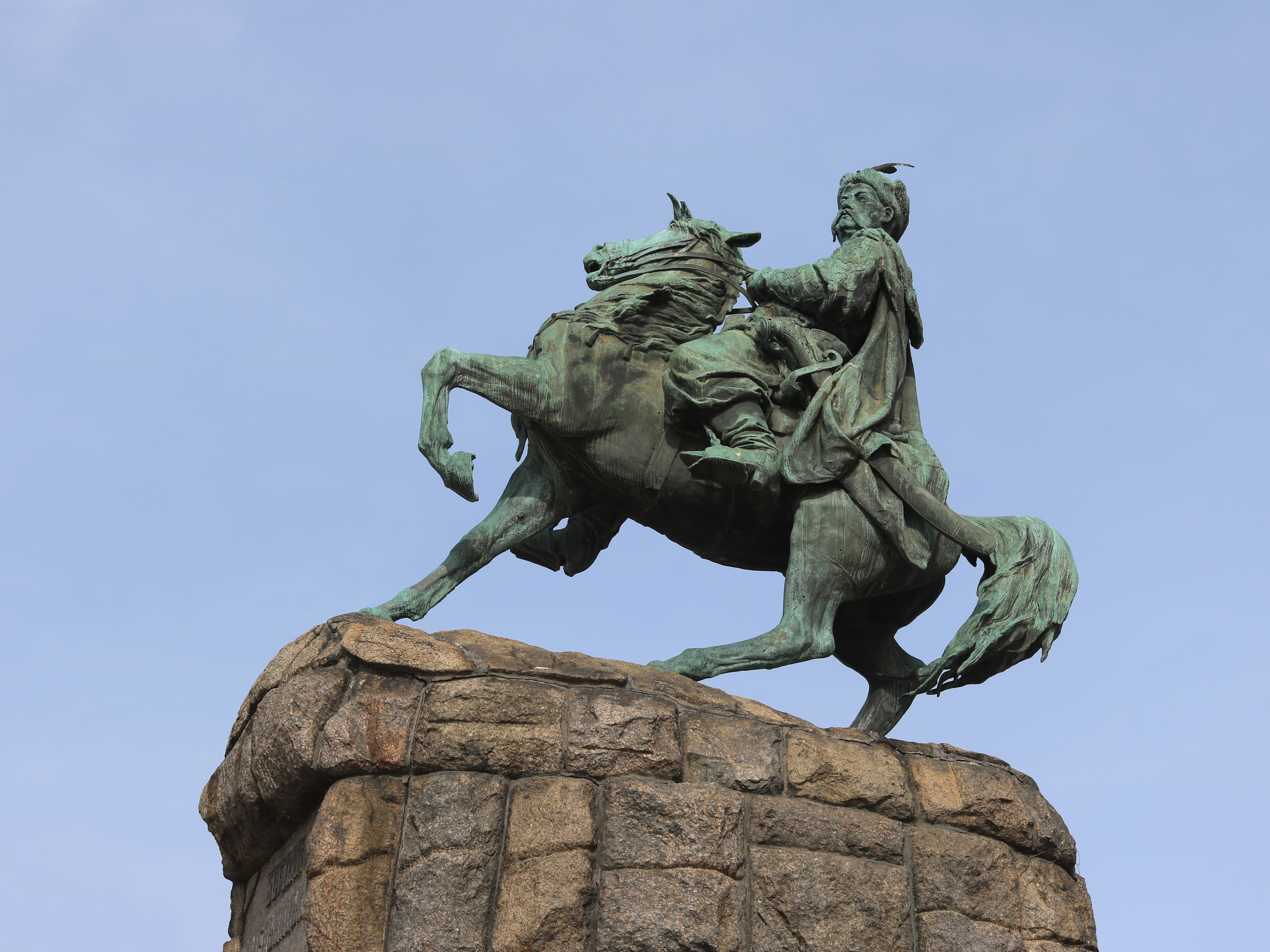
- Bohdan Khmelnytsky Monument, Kyiv
Date	January – November 1648
Location	Eastern parts of Polish-Lithuanian Commonwealth (present-day Ukraine and southern parts of Belarus)
Result	Cossack-led victory
Territorial changes	Zaporozhian Host captures most of the Ukraine and parts of Belarus: Cossack pogroms of Jews

Belligerents
Zaporozhian Host; Crimean Khanate	Polish–Lithuanian Commonwealth

Commanders and leaders
Bohdan Khmelnytsky; Tymofiy Khmelnytsky; Maksym Kryvonis # Ivan Bohun; Ivan Sirko; Mykhailo Krychevsky; Martyn Pushkar; Filon Dzhelaliy; Petro Holovatskyi; Ivan Hyria; Oleksandr Kryvonosenko; Matviy Hladky; Mykhailo Hromyka; John Sokolovskiy (WIA); Tugay Bey	Władysław IV Vasa # Jeremi Wiśniowiecki; Janusz Łohojski; Władysław Zasławski; Mikołaj Ostroróg; Aleksander Koniecpolski; Stefan Potocki (POW) # Mikołaj Potocki (POW); Stefan Czarniecki (POW); Marcin Kalinowski (POW); Stanisław Krzyczewski (D); Andrzej Potocki (surrendered); Stefan Lew †

Strength
100,000 (peak strength)	100,000 (peak strength)

The Khmelnytsky's campaign of 1648 refers to a series of events during the Khmelnytsky Uprising, where the Zaporozhian Cossacks and their Crimean Tatar allies inflicted a series of defeats on the Polish-Lithuanian forces in present-day Ukraine and southern parts of Belarus. The campaign took place from January to November 1648, and made up the first phase of this major Cossack uprising. This phase was also marked by rampant Cossack violence against Poles and Jews, which led to tens of thousands of deaths and more being enslaved by Crimean Tatars.

== Prelude ==
Before the uprising took place, Bohdan Khmelnytsky was a minor Ruthenian nobleman of the Commonwealth, distinguishing himself in their service. However, according to Cossack chronicles, Khmelnytsky got into conflict with the Polish noble Stanisław Koniecpolski as a result of Khmelnytsky's condemning comments about the Kodak fortress. Stanisław and later his son Aleksander Koniecpolski abused their power, using it to persecute Khemlnytsky, attacking his property and family. Khmelnytsky's son, Ostap, was tortured at Chyhyryn market which led to Ostap's death. Khmelnytsky sought justice in courts and from the Polish King Władysław. His efforts to find justice through the legal means were in vain, but nonetheless the King allowed Khmelnytsky to fight back.

Aleksander Koniecpolski ordered for Bohdan Khmelnytsky to be detained and executed. However, Khmelnytsky was saved by his high-ranking friends, which gave Khmelnytsky an opportunity to escape and use the injustice he suffered as a pretext for the planned uprising. When his initial plan failed, in the autumn of 1647, he and his supporters fled to the Zaporizhian Sich, which at the time was headquartered at the Mykytyn Sich.

== Campaign ==
=== Zaporozhian Sich (January – February) ===
The Cherkasy Regiment, consisting of several hundred Registered Cossacks in Polish service, defected to Khmelnytsky's side. On 4 February 1648 (Old Style 25 January 1648), Khmelnytsky, his son Tymofiy Khmelnytsky, his followers and the Cherkasy Regiment took control over Mykytyn Sich with the support of the Zaporizhians. This marked the beginning of the uprising. They took out the Polish garrison that guarded the Sich, allowing them to take control of it and access its military power. Khmelnytsky's forces repelled a Polish counter-attack on 9 February (30 January). Next, Khmelnytsky mobilised numerous Cossacks and peasant militias for his campaign. He also concluded an alliance with the Crimean Khanate by the Treaty of Bakhchisarai (c. 15 March 1648).

=== Left-Bank Ukraine (April – May) ===
The Polish forces became aware of the unrest that was occurring in Left-Bank Ukraine and Khmelntsky's insurgent army. Mikołaj Potocki was sent out with his army to put down the uprising. In April, the Polish army sent out to Ukraine was made up of 30,000 troops.

The Battle of Zhovti Vody was the first major confrontation of the uprising. Many of the registered Cossacks defected to the rebels during the battle. The Polish forces were surrounded and made a desperate attempt to break out at night, but were caught in an ambush and completely defeated on 5–6 May. Out of 5,000 Polish troops, up to 3,000 were captured, with the rest killed and only a few managing to escape. The Cossack-Tatar losses didn't exceed 150 killed and the same amount of wounded.

On 25–26 May, another battle took place known as the Battle of Korsuń. The Polish army was made up of 20,000 troops while the Cossack-Tatar army had 15,000~20,000 troops. However, the Polish army feared to meet the fate of defeat at Zhovti Vody and attempted to retreat from their positions. They were harassed by Cossack troops, which forced parts of the army to trying passing through the muddy forest. Their artillery and carts got stuck in the mud, which the Cossack army under Maksym Kryvonis used as an opportunity to strike a crushing blow on the Polish forces. As a result of the battle, 8,500 Polish soldiers were captured, only 1,500 troops managed to flee, and the rest was killed.

The series of defeats suffered by the Polish noble army in Left-Bank Ukraine made many of them reconsider the idea of attempting to suppress the uprising there. Jeremi Wiśniowiecki with several thousands troops attempted to mobilise the Polish forces on the Left Bank for the struggle, but he himself was ultimately forced to retreat to Right-Bank Ukraine with the rest of the nobles. Wiśniowiecki intended to employ a scorched-earth policy there, in attempt to slow down the Cossack rebel forces.

=== Right-Bank Ukraine (June – August) ===
After the Cossack victories on the Left-Bank, Khmelnytsky captured Bila Tserkva and intended to move on the Right-Bank Ukraine. His hopes of resolving the conflict diplomatically were dashed by the death of King Władysław IV Vasa (20 May 1648), which left only the magnates that sought to protect their endangered property. Jeremi Wiśniowiecki and other Polish nobles entered Podolia during summer. The devastation was accompanied by a mutual cycle of violence which targeted Polish, Ruthenian and Jewish civilians. Jews were targeted by Cossacks as they were believed to have been representatives of the Polish nobility.

In July, Wiśniowiecki's forces suffered defeats against Cossack leader Maksym Kryvonis during the Battles of Makhnivka and Kostiantyniv. Fighting also took place Lypovets (present-day Vinnytsia Oblast) and other settlements, which compelled the Polish forces to avoid open fighting, and entrench themselves in fortresses. However, one such fortress that was considered to be impregnable, Bar, was captured by colonel Kryvonis on 4 August, which proved to be a massive blow to Polish morale. The bloody fighting was accompanied by mutual atrocities on the civilian population.

=== Cossack triumph (September – November) ===
At the end of summer, the Polish government sent out a 40,000-strong army (including 8,000 German mercenaries) with the objective of suppressing the uprising. Both sides in total could have had up to 100,000 troops at this stage. A major battle took place at Pyliavtsi (21–23 September 1648 New Style; 11–13 September Old Style). The turning point of the battle occurred when a captured Cossack gave a misleading information to the Polish forces, stating that the Crimean Khan was coming to the aid of Cossacks with a huge army. In reality, only a small unit of Budjak Tatars arrived, but nonetheless the presented misleading information put the Polish army into the state of panic and subsequent disorganised retreat on 14 September (Old Style; 24 September New Style). Many of the Polish troops were taken prisoner and their equipment was captured. After this victory, Cossacks mockingly nicknamed the Polish nobles who participated in this battle "pylyavtsy". Cossacks captured Volhynia and Podolia after their triumph at Pyliavtsi.

In October, the Kodak fortress capitulated to the Cossacks. The Cossack-Tatar army besieged Lviv. Kryvonis's detachments captured the Lviv High Castle. However, Khmelnytsky made a decision to simply collect tribute as he did n't want to risk devastation of the city by his Tatar allies in case Lviv was fully captured. The Cossack army also entered Belarus and surrounded Jeremi Wiśniowiecki's forces at Zamość during this stage. Khmelnytsky again limited himself to collecting tribute and his campaign was completed by the time John II Casimir Vasa was elected as new the King on 17 November, after which his coronation was supported by Khmelnytsky.

== Aftermath ==
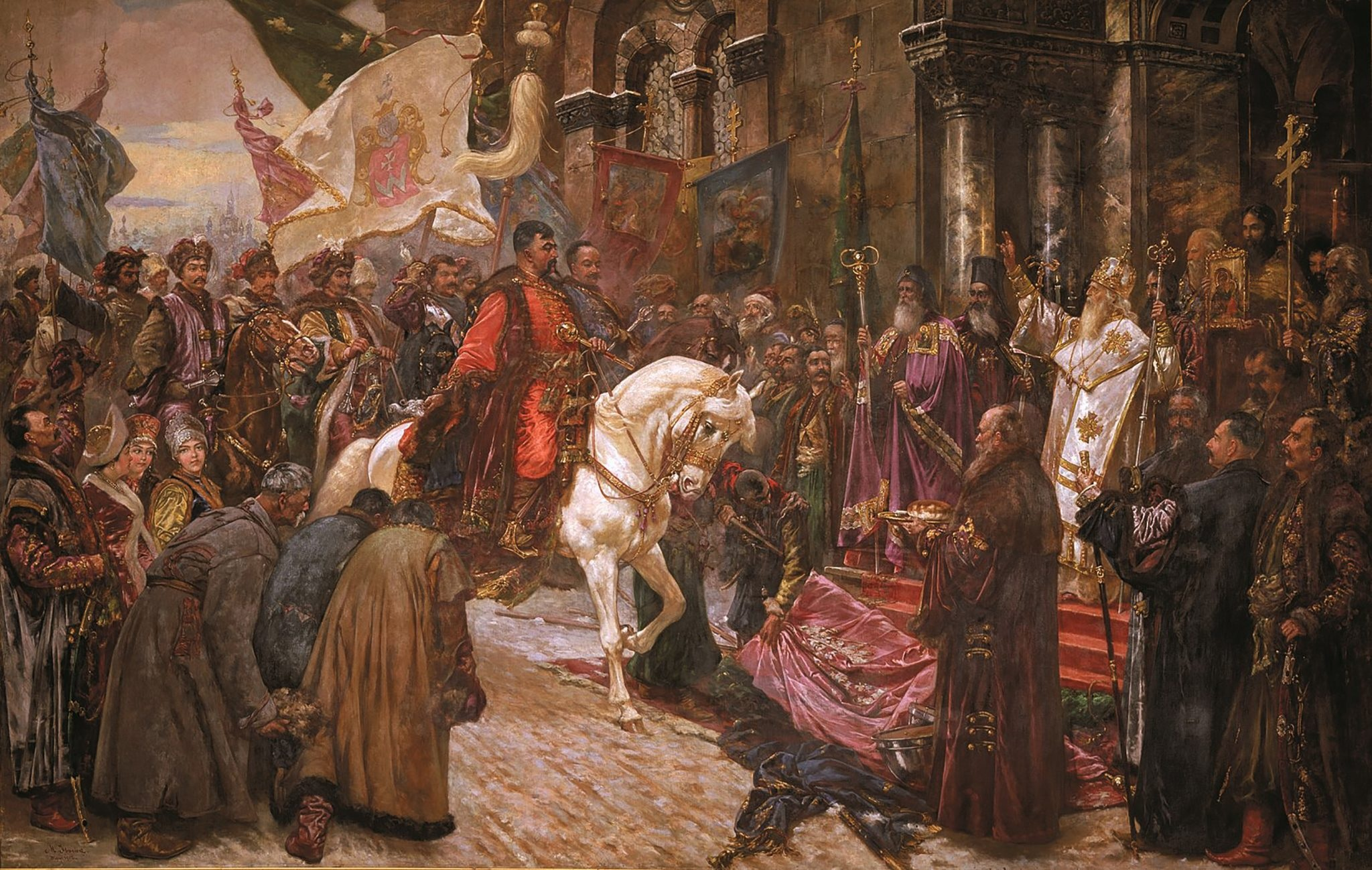
Entrance of Bohdan Khmelnytskyi to Kyiv in 1649 by Mykola Ivasyuk

The 1648 campaign ended in a major victory for the Zaporozhian Cossacks and led to them gaining control of all the Ukrainian lands up to western Galicia. Nonetheless, Khmelnytsky still believed in reaching compromise and recognition of his de facto newly established state (sometimes called "Ukraine" or "Ruthenia") as part of a triune Commonwealth, which was to include the Crown of the Kingdom of Poland, the Grand Duchy of Lithuania, and the Hetmanate of Ukraine.

On 2 January 1649, Bohdan Khmelnytsky entered Kyiv. He was greeted as the "Moses, the savior, deliverer and liberator of the Rus' people from the slavery of the Lyaks [Poles]... the most enlightened ruler of princely Rus'". Bohdan Khmelnytsky was nicknamed "The Whip of God" (also called "The Scourge of God") by the Poles. This nickname was previously given to Attila of the Huns who were known for bringing terror to the Western and Eastern Roman Empires, also known to have ruled over the territory of present-day Ukraine. The Khmelnytsky Uprising of 1648 became known as one of the largest and most successful revolts of the 17th century, which led to formation of the Cossack Hetmanate and allowed it to become a major player in European affairs during the 1650s.
