= Battle of Kostiantyniv =

Battle of the Khmelnytsky Uprising

- Part of the Khmelnytsky Uprising
Date	26 – 28 July 1648
Location	Kostiantyniv, Ikopot and Sluch Rivers, Podolian Voivodeship, Polish–Lithuanian Commonwealth (Present-day in Ukraine)
Result	See § Aftermath

Belligerents
Zaporozhian Cossacks	Polish–Lithuanian Commonwealth

Commanders and leaders
Maksym Kryvonis; Ivan Hyria	Jeremi Wiśniowiecki; Janusz Tyszkiewicz Łohojski; Władysław Dominik Zasławski

Strength
24,000–34,000 peasants 16,000 cavalry and infantry (July 28)	30,000–32,000 servants 8,000–10,000 cavalry and infantry

Casualties and losses
July 26: 10,000–15,000 killed and wounded (Polish claim); July 28: 1,500–3,000 killed and wounded	July 26: 100 killed and wounded July 28: 100–300 killed and wounded

The Battle of Kostiantyniv (Ukrainian: Битва під Костянтиновим, Polish: Bitwa pod Konstantynowem) was fought between the Zaporozhian Host and the Polish–Lithuanian Commonwealth as a part of the Khmelnytsky Uprising took place on 26 to 28 July 1648. Near the site of the present-day town of Starokostiantyniv on the Ikopot and Sluch Rivers in Ukraine, a forces of the Zaporozhian Cossacks and the Ukrainian peasants under the command of Maksym Kryvonis and Ivan Hyria attacked the Polish–Lithuanian army under the command of Jeremi Wiśniowiecki, Janusz Tyszkiewicz Łohojski and Władysław Dominik Zasławski.

== Prelude ==
The news of the Cossack victories at the Battle of Zhovti Vody and the Korsun caused an outbreak of rebellion against the Polish-Lithuanian authorities. Samovydets writes about this in his chronicle: "Everything that lives rose up to become a Cossack". The only significant military force of the Poland-Lithuania in the vastness of Ukraine after the loss of almost the entire crown army in the Battle of Korsun remained the court army of the prince and Rus voivode Wiśniowiecki. Having received news of the defeat at Korsun, Jeremi Wiśniowiecki left Transdniepryansk.

In Left-Bank Ukraine, large rebel detachments already in early June destroyed the residence of Wiśniowiecki in Lubny, and during the same month captured Borzna, Nizhyn and Novgorod-Siversky. In the Southern Kyiv region, Bratslav region and Podillia, burning noble estates and capturing cities and towns, detachments of Maksym Kryvonis, Ivan Ganzh, Oleksandrenko, Chuyko, Tryphon of Bershad, Neminikorchma, Koshka (Kushka), Stepko and others marched. In July–August, united peasant-bourgeois formations appeared in Volhynia and Polissya, and at the end of August—in Galicia and Pokuttia, by the fall of 1648 covering the entire Ukrainian space from Chernihiv-Siver region to the Carpathians.

Having made his way with an 8,000-strong court army from the Left Bank to Polissya, in the second half of June 1648, Prince Wiśniowiecki set out to pacify the Kyiv and Bratslav regions. The princely army passed through Kotelnya, Vchoraishe, Pogrebyshe, Vakhnivka, Nemyriv and Pryluka and brutally suppressed the uprising in all these cities.

After battles with rebel detachments at Makhnivka, which did not bring a decisive advantage to either side, Wiśniowiecki together with Kyiv voivode Janusz Tyszkiewicz learned that on July 23, the rebel detachment of Maksym Kryvonis had captured Polonne. Under Konstyantyniv, the troops of Wiśniowiecki and Tyszkiewicz joined with 1,200 soldiers of the royal guard led by obozny Samuil Osinsky and 1,200 soldiers of the ordnance cavalry and dragoons of Wladyslaw Dominik Zaslavsky-Ostrozky under the command of Krzysztof Korytsky.

On July 25, Wiśniowiecki's forces learned that Kryvonos's army was a mile and a half from Kostyantyniv. A captured Cossack said that Kryvonos intended to attack the city that very night. The voivode's troops, stationed a little west of Konstyantyniv, began to approach the city. The infantry occupied it, while the cavalry stood in the field, watching for the enemy. On the morning of July 26, all the magnate forces camped near Kostiantyniv, near the Rosolovetska crossing, on the left bank of the Sluch River. Soon, a detachment of Colonel Sukhodolsky arrived here, numbering 2,300 soldiers, of whom 500 were infantrymen. The combined noble troops, according to contemporary sources, reached 10,000–15,000 soldiers.

== Battle ==
=== First Battle ===
On July 26, in the middle of the day, Cossack reconnaissance detachments approached the right bank of the Sluch. A reconnaissance detachment set out from the magnate's camp across the ford, which managed to capture a Cossack in a fight. During interrogation, he reported that Kryvonos had 50,000 troops, about 2/3 of which were poorly armed rebel peasants. According to Polish sources, Kryvonos was accompanied by a significant part of the rebel peasants, who played a supporting role in his army. The Cossacks themselves numbered no more than 16,000. Kryvonis marched in two columns, the first with cavalry, the second with a camp of foot Cossacks and peasants.

Prince Wiśniowiecki decided to line up his army along the Sluch River, with the Kostyantyns in the rear. The noble army lined up in the traditional way for them: on the right wing stood the cavalry of Krzysztof Korytski and Janusz Tyszkiewicz, on the left wing stood Wiśniowiecki with his cavalry, and in the center was the infantry with artillery. The prince ordered several hundred Herts hunters to cross the river and engage the Cossack cavalry.

The Cossacks across the river allowed the enemy Hertsivniks to cross. Having repelled their brief attack, the Cossacks began to ford the river. Kryvonis, confident of his numerical superiority, launched a frontal attack with all his cavalry. In the vanguard was the Bila Tserkva Regiment, commanded by Ivan Girya. The mounted Cossacks were opposed by Samuil Osinsky, defending the crossing near the mill on the river, with a company of musketeers of the royal guard and a pair of small regimental cannons, supported by battery of Wiśniowiecki's guns. The nobles suffered significant losses, but thanks to concentrated artillery fire, the Cossack attack was repelled.

Then Kryvonis threw all his forces into battle (since the camp remained in the rear, apparently the infantry, not covered by the camp, entered the field). After a fierce battle, the Cossacks retreated. The nobles immediately launched a counterattack with several banners of the magnate's cavalry. Seeing success, prince Wiśniowiecki threw all his cavalry into battle, which pursued the fugitives all the way to the Cossack camp, a mile and a half away. The prince had the clear intention of breaking into the fortified camp on the shoulders of the retreating enemy.

The magnate cavalry occupied the surrounding hills, waiting for the arrival of infantry and artillery, necessary for the assault on the camp. The infantry crossed the Sluch only in the evening. Given the twilight, the significant numerical superiority of the Cossack army and the strong rifle and cannon fire from the camp, the nobles abandoned their attempt to capture it and retreated to their own bank of the river. Wiśniowiecki, who insisted on immediate assault on the camp, was unable to convince other magnate commanders, primarily Tyshkevych, of his rightness. That day, the Cossack troops lost 2,000–3,000 people. Some sources, such as Diary of Mashkevych, give estimates up to 10,000 dead rebels. This may be considered an exaggeration, but if the magnate cavalry pursued the fleeing Cossacks and rebels for a mile and a half (and before that, some of them must have been trapped between the noble ranks and the river), the losses of Kryvonos's army must have been very significant, not counting the Polonyans, including centurion Poluyan, who may have commanded the cavalry of the Cossack vanguard. From Poluyan, who, according to the Polish side, was familiar with information at the level of the Hetman's Cossack councils, it became known that Khmelnytsky had set out with a huge army and Kryvonos had the task of holding Wiśniowiecki for as long as possible.

=== Ceasefire ===
On July 27, no fighting took place, the sources do not even mention minor skirmishes. Apparently, Kryvonis conducted reconnaissance of the area during the day, considered a plan to fight in Sluch the next day and waited for the Korsun Regiment, which arrived in the area of fighting in the evening. In addition, about 10,000 rebel peasants approached Kryvonis. There is also information that in the evening Kryvonis crossed the river, above Kostyantyniv, part of his cavalry with the intention of striking the rear of the nobles.

It is also believed that on this day Kryvonis challenged Wiśniowiecki to a duel, but he did not accept the challenge.

The rebel army enjoyed the full support of the local population. On the night of July 26 to 27, the inhabitants of Kostyantyniv brought a significant amount of provisions and gunpowder to Kryvonis's camp. Wiśniowiecki became aware of this on July 27, and as a result, more than 40 townspeople were executed.

Having received news of the approach of Khmelnytsky's army, the magnate's military council, convened by Wiśniowiecki, decided to break away from the enemy and retreat to the west. Wiśniowiecki continued to insist on storming the camp, Tyshkevych also insisted on retreat, the other commanders hesitated, but since the prince, Wiśniowiecki, did not have the authority to order other commanders to do as he saw fit, it was decided to retreat.

Preparing for the retreat, Wiśniowiecki ordered the commander of the infantry regiment Osinsky to take up positions near the ford on the left bank of the Sluch River by dawn and to hold off the Cossacks during the day July 28, ensuring the retreat of the army to the west. As soon as the first signs of dawn appeared, the magnate's convoy, the guards regiment and Sukhodolsky's infantry moved towards Kulchyn (west of Konstyantyniv), followed by the cavalry at a walk.

Meanwhile, the Cossack camp advanced in the direction of the magnate camp and appeared near the river on the morning of July 28, forcing a new battle on Wiśniowiecki, which the nobles did not expect.

=== Second Battle ===
When Kryvonis began his attack, the magnate camp, infantry, and artillery had retreated to a distance of two miles from Kostyantyniv. The Ford across the Sluch was initially covered by a company of infantry (120 soldiers) under Osinski, but it was soon replaced by the dragoons of Dominik Zaslavsky.

When dawn broke, the nobles saw a Cossack army on the right bank of the Sluch, lined up in battle formation. At a signal, the Cossacks began to cross the river. Kryvonis advanced with all his forces, and the noble rearguard could not withstand such an onslaught. The Cossacks began to cross the Sluch with a wide front.

There is an interesting report about the battle order of the Cossack army before the offensive on July 28. It says that Kryvonis set up a camp on the right flank, cavalry on the left, and artillery in the center. This construction of the Cossack army was caused by the insufficient presence of cavalry, which created a tactical advantage in favor of Wiśniowiecki's army in this type of army. The insurgent army had a battle order built on the principle of strong mutual support of its individual tactical units, but it lost in an important parameter of battle — maneuverability. The lack of the necessary number of cavalry did not allow Kryvonis to line up his army according to the scheme of a counter-battle (or a battle with a retreating enemy), as Khmelnytsky did at the Battle of Zhovti Vody and near Korsun. There, an advanced detachment of mobile Tatar cavalry was allocated, which met (Zhovti Vody) or overtook (Korsun) the noble army and delayed it until the approach of the main forces, while simultaneously creating conditions for surrounding the enemy. The fact that after the Battle of Makhnivka it was not possible to catch up with Wiśniowiecki's army, although it moved at the speed of its own convoy, indicates that it was pursued by an infantry Cossack detachment, built as a camp of carts. By the way, the insufficient presence of cavalry in the Cossack army can also explain Wiśniowiecki's impunity and daring raid on Left-Bank and Right-Bank Ukraine in June–July 1648. Since during the Cossack advance to Konstyantyniv, an infantry detachment was in the vanguard (under the protection of the camp), its marching guard consisted of infantry units, which, apparently, moved on horseback.

Quickly orienting himself in the situation, prince Wiśniowiecki turned back the cavalry. The magnate army was as follows: Krzysztof Korycki and Janusz Tyszkiewicz occupied the right wing, Prince Wiśniowiecki — the left. In the center were Sukhodolski, Osynski's infantry and artillery. Wiśniowiecki decided to use the favorable conditions and attack the Cossacks, who had just crossed and had not yet lined up in a deployed battle formation, with cavalry.

Kryvonis began crossing the Sluch with the left wing of the army. Wiśniowiecki held back the artillery fire and ordered his troops to feign retreat, allowing the Cossacks to cross. Kryvonis took this as a sign of panic among the nobility. When more than 10,000 Cossacks crossed, the entire magnate cavalry attacked them at once. The Cossacks were driven back across the river to the camp with heavy losses, and the magnate cavalry returned to their previous positions. This maneuver was repeated three times.

The fact that Kryvonis was caught in such a ruse three times can only be explained by the fact that he relied on his numerical superiority and was certain that the next time he would defeat the prince Wiśniowiecki's cavalry. The third time, Wiśniowiecki himself led the noble attack. Having crossed the river in pursuit of the Cossacks, Yarema attacked the Cossack guns, capturing 4 or 5 large guns, two gakivnytsia and two "ozhiga" (perhaps the diariushs entries confuse gakivnytsia and ozhyga). 21 crown flags were captured by Cossacks near Korsun and Zhovti Vody, and other flags were recovered. The left wing and center of the Cossack front ceased to exist. Only the camp remained intact. The Cossack cavalry, previously transferred to the left bank of the Sluch River, did not dare to attack Wiśniowiecki in the rear.

Wiśniowiecki wanted to use both tactical and psychological advantages to attack the camp with cavalry. Tyszkiewicz did not agree to this, which equally angered the prince and shook the authority of the Kiev voivode Tyszkiewicz among his soldiers. These sentiments are evidenced by the entry in Mashkewicz's diary about this incident: "the prince wrote in gold, and the voivode sealed it with dirt". Having no other choice, Wiśniowiecki left the Cossack camp alone, accompanied himself with the rearguard and began a retreat further west, through Kulchyn to Zbarazh. Kryvonis soon crossed to the other bank of the Sluch and occupied Kostyantyniv. The Polish army fled by forced march to Kulchyn, and from there to the west, to Zbarazh.

It is impossible not to pay attention to the fact that, having suffered defeat during the year 1648, the nobility, in covering the events near Makhivka and Starokostyantinov, presents ordinary episodes of the battle, which did not have a decisive influence on its course, as great military achievements of Wiśniowiecki. Among such ordinary episodes is the defeat of a Cossack outpost (by the way, the fate of outposts is always the same) and the capture of 5 light cannons and 4 rifles from the Cossacks during the battle for the Rosolovetsk crossing. All descriptions of Wiśniowiecki's activities are permeated by the leading idea that he was a brilliant commander, but his talent did not reveal itself, because he was hindered, and first of all, by the Kiev voivode Tyshkevych.

It must be said that the idea of capturing the camp by cavalry was somewhat adventurous and would certainly have led to heavy losses among the attackers, but this time psychological factor was against Cossacks, who after the defeat of their cavalry and artillery were close to panic, which was confirmed later by the prisoners taken. The prisoners said that in the event of an assault on the camp by the nobility, the Cossacks were ready to submit, and even to betray Kryvonis.

== Aftermath ==
The Poles lost their camp, it was looted by the Cossacks, they received some trophies there, but according to Polish sources, they lost 13,000 - 18,000 killed and wounded. The nobles probably lost no more than 500 killed. The battle, from a strategic point of view, although it involved significant forces, was of little importance and did not affect the pace of the uprising spread. Kryvonos's march was not stopped — his corps soon occupied Volyn and Podolia and also besieged Kamenets.

Sources differ on the outcome of the battle. Some claim that it ended with the victory of the Poles, others claim Cossack victory.

Although the Cossacks managed to cross the river, they suffered heavy casualties and, more importantly, were unable to tie up the Polish forces until the arrival of Khmelnytsky, who was still in Pavolocha on 30 July.

Kryvonis didn't attempt to pursue Wiśniowiecki. Ukrainian historian Ivan Stotozhenko uses this as evidence that defeating Wiśniowiecki wasn't the main objective of Kryvonis. Cossacks captured the strategically important city of Kostiantyniv, Kryvonis prepared the ground for blocking the main communications bordering it and turned Kostiantyniv into a stronghold of main Cossack army. Kryvonis kept the main Cossack forces there, while ordering peasant units to capture towns in the strip assigned to him by Khmelnytsky, to the border of Ostroh, Krasyliv, Sataniv and Kamianets-Podilskyi. In early August, Kryvonis led the capture of Bar and Kamianets-Podilskyi, which were considered to be the most powerful fortresses at the time. With all these factors taken into account, Stotozhenko concludes that Kryvonis managed to achieve his main objective.

Wiśniowiecki's campaign in Volhynia and his merciless repression of the rebels terribly irritated the Cossacks. If at the end of June Khmelnytsky and the foreman decided to stop military operations, waiting for the results of their embassy from Warsaw, and let the Tatars go to Crimea with a yasyr, and Khmelnytsky himself with the entire Cossack army retreated to Chyhyryn, now the fear of losing his leading role forced Khmelnytsky to interrupt his peaceful policy and again take up armed actions. Already in the first days of July he transferred the mobilization and gathered the left-bank regiments to him. He again called for the help of the Tatars. On July 20, 1648, Khmelnytsky with his headquarters was already in Pavoloch. He sent a letter to Prince Zaslavsky, in which he motivated the disruption of the truce by the provocative actions of Wiśniowiecki, which, he said, outraged and irritated the entire Ukrainian people. Thus began Khmelnytsky's second campaign of 1648, culminating in the Battle of Pyliavtsi.
