= Battle of Makhnivka =

- Part of the Khmelnytsky Uprising
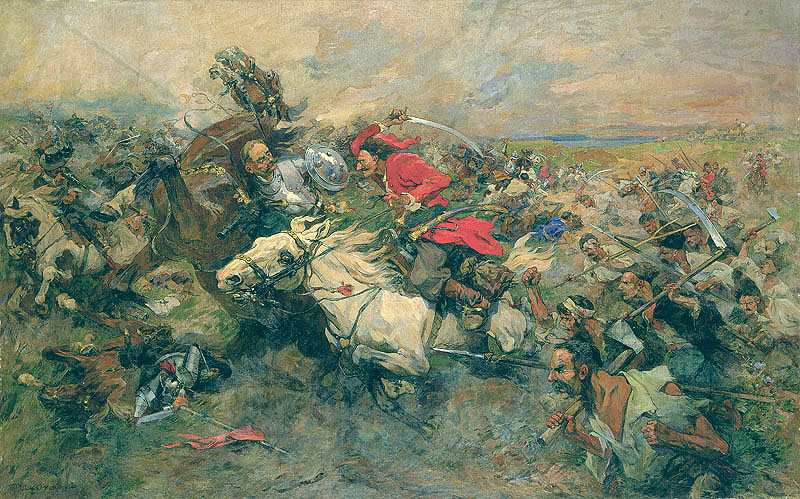
- Battle of Maksym Kryvonis with Jeremi Wiśniowiecki by Nikolay Samokish
Date	6–8 July 1648
Location	Makhnivka, Bracław Voivodeship, Polish–Lithuanian Commonwealth (modern-day Vinnytsia Oblast, Ukraine)
Result	Cossack victory

Belligerents
Zaporozhian Cossacks	Polish–Lithuanian Commonwealth

Commanders and leaders
Maksym Kryvonis; Petro Holovatskyi; Ivan Hyria; Oleksandr Kryvonosenko	Jeremi Wiśniowiecki; Janusz Tyszkiewicz; Stefan Lew †

Strength
13,000	Unknown

Casualties and losses
Unknown	2,500 killed

The Battle of Makhnivka (Note: Ukrainian: Битва під Махнівкою Russian: Битва под Махновкой Polish: Bitwa pod Machnówką) took place between the Cossack-peasant army led by Maksym Kryvonis and the Polish–Lithuanian forces led by Jeremi Wiśniowiecki, it took place during 6–8 July in 1648, ending in Cossack victory.

== Prelude ==
The Makhnivka fortress served as one of the Polish-Lithuanian strongholds in Bracław Voivodeship. In late June and early July, several thousand rebel peasants gathered near Makhnivka. Jeremi Wiśniowiecki retreated from the Left-Bank Ukraine and entered Bracław Voivodeship. Most the region was controlled by the rebel peasantry and Cossacks of Maksym Kryvonis.

Wiśniowiecki's forces was the only well-armed detachment capable of facing the rebels during this period, whose fighting methods were often accompanied with massacres. Bohdan Khmelnytsky sent 5,000 Cossacks led by Ivan Girya. Another 8,000 Cossacks of Ostap Kryvonosenko and Maksym Kryvonis joined in besieging Makhnivka.

== Battle ==
On 8 July, Cossacks and rebel peasants besieged Makhnivka. Cossacks successfully stormed and captured most of the fortress and were now besieging the castle where Stefan Lew was holding out with his troops. Cossacks attempted to storm the fortress, which was initially unsuccessful. Cossacks captured Bernardine monastery and made another assault on the castle. They managed to lur Lew out of the castle and took the castle. Polish-Lithuanian forces suffered heavy losses and Lew himself was killed. Janusz Tyszkiewicz received the news about capture of Makhnivka and requested for Wiśniowiecki to deal with the rebels.

In the evening, Wiśniowiecki attempted to quietly surround Makhnivka with his large army, but was unsuccessful. Kryvonis was outside Makhnivka with his cavalry where he took Wiśniowiecki by surprise in the attack, which nearly got Wiśniowiecki killed twice. Wiśniowiecki attempted to destroy Cossack camp at night several times, but was repulsed. Tyszkiewicz later requested for Wiśniowiecki to cease his attacks due to the risk of Tyszkiewicz's estate getting completely burnt by Cossacks if they prevail over Wiśniowiecki's forces.

== Aftermath ==
The battle resulted in destruction of Makhnivka and weakening of the Polish-Lithuanian influence. More fighting shortly took place between the forces of Maksym Kryvonis and Jeremi Wiśniowiecki at Kostiantyniv and Pyliavtsi.

According to Samiilo Velychko, Wiśniowiecki's forces in failed attacks on Makhnivka suffered 2,500 killed and Wiśniowiecki was forced to retreat. Wiśniowiecki was left traumatised by the experience of nearly getting killed twice in a single battle, losing his courage that he previously had in fighting Cossacks directly.

Polish sources describe the battle differently. According to Polish noble report, Cossacks withdrew from Makhnivka behind a hill when Wiśniowiecki approached, organising a defense out of carts and other material. Wiśniowiecki launched two failed attacks, but didn't dare to attack for the third time due to rain, which put Cossacks into a favourable defensive position. Cossacks then pretended to have organised a strong defense and made their presence known with singing, but in the morning broke through to Hrytsiv. Some of Wiśniowiecki's forces made failed attempts to pursue the Cossacks. Afterwards, on Friday (3/10 July) Wiśniowiecki himself withdrew from Makhnivka. Later, Wiśniowiecki received the news about return of Kryvonis and his Cossacks to Makhnivka, but Wiśniowiecki didn't dare to return there.

== Legacy ==
The Jewish community of Makhnivka was first mentioned in 1648, which was an account of when Cossacks were reported to have seized the fortress, then proceeding with massacre of Poles and Jews.

== See also ==
- Battle of Kostiantyniv
- Siege of Bar
- Battle of Pyliavtsi

== Bibliography ==
- Mytsyik, Yuriy (1992). "Максим Кривоніс" [Maksym Kryvonis] (in Ukrainian). Dnipropetrovsk: Ukrainian Historical Journal.
