= Siege of Bar (1649) =

- Part of the Khmelnytsky Uprising
Date	February 1649
Location	Bar, Bracław Voivodeship, Polish–Lithuanian Commonwealth
Result	Polish–Lithuanian victory
Territorial changes	Poland-Lithuania recaptures Bar

Belligerents
Zaporozhian Cossacks	Polish–Lithuanian Commonwealth

Commanders and leaders
Unknown	Piotr Potocki

Strength
Unknown	Unknown

Casualties and losses
Entire garrison killed	Unknown

The siege of Bar took place between the Cossack garrison of Bar and the Polish–Lithuanian forces of the Bar fortress, during which Polish commander Piotr Potocki laid a siege on the fortress, capturing the fortress and defeating its garrison, in February 1649.

== Prelude ==
Bar fortress was an important defense point of Podolia, which came under control of Cossacks during the previous siege. Piotr Potocki gathered an army with the goal of retaking Bar fortress and taking revenge on Cossacks in 1649.

== Siege ==
On February, Piotr Potocki besieged Bar fortress. Potocki was responsible for maintaining the Kamianets-Podilskyi and was in charge of it, but he still took part in campaigns against Cossacks. Much like Maksym Kryvonis during the siege of 1648, Potocki used trickery and scheming in order to get into Bar fortress. After Potocki managed to get into the fortress with his army, he fought and defeated the Cossack garrison of Bar, reportedly leaving no one alive from the garrison. This was described as Polish forces taking revenge on Cossacks, who broke their promise of peaceful capitulation to the Polish Bar garrison in 1648, executing Polish prisoners.

The news of the loss of Bar fortress to Polish forces infuriated Bohdan Khmelnytsky. This led to crueler treatment of Polish prisoners held by the Cossacks, including Kudak garrison. Khmelnytsky reportedly refused to hand over Andrzej Polotcki who was captured in the previous siege of Bar.

== Aftermath ==
The loss of Bar fortress to Polish forces was a major blow to Cossack control over Podolia. Khmelnytsky was particularly dissatisfied about the loss of Bar. When the Commonwealth envoys arrived, Khmelnytsky treated them like captives, not allowing them to leave. Khmelnytsky clearly expressed his dissatisfaction about losing Bar fortress and ongoing actions of Piotr Potocki in Podolia, saying to the commissioners present at the meeting:

It's a pity about this howory, God gave them to me. I will kill them, if there is no provocation to war from Lithuania and the Poles are not raised. Let Potocki wait here for his brother, the starost of Kamieniec, who took Bar, my city, from me; in my Podolia he is shedding Christian blood, I ordered the regiments to move there and bring him back alive.
