= Pyliava, Khmelnytskyi Oblast =

Village in Khmelnytskyi Oblast, Ukraine

Pyliava Пилява
- Village
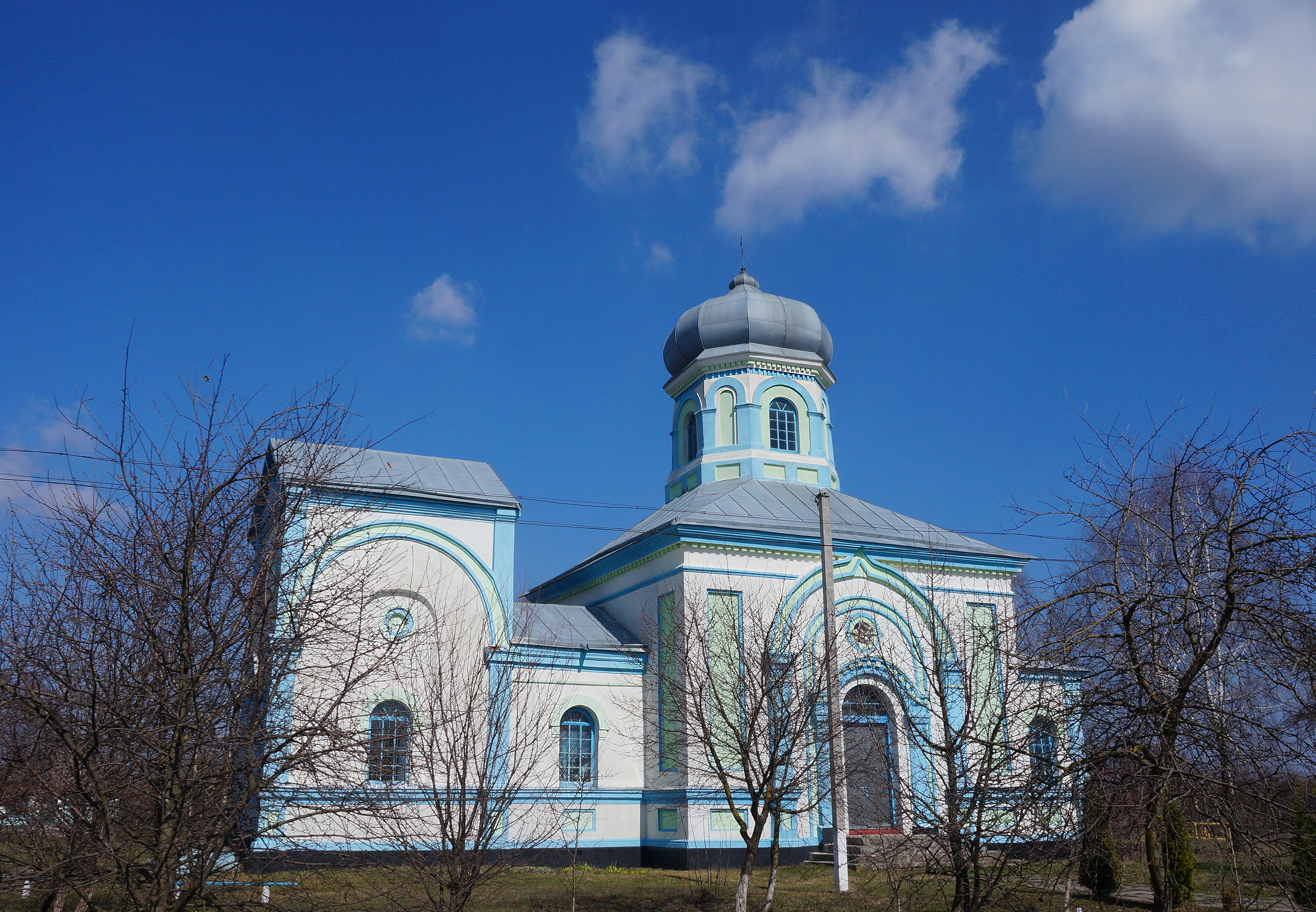

- Location within Ukraine Location within Khmelnytskyi Oblast
- Country: Ukraine
- Oblast: Khmelnytskyi Oblast
- Raion: Khmelnytskyi Raion
- Hromada: Stara Syniava rural hromada
- Founded: 1420

Area
  - Total: 4.5 km^{2} (1.7 sq mi)

Population
  - Total: 672
- Website: Ukrainian Parliament website

Pyliava (Ukrainian: Пилява) is a village (selo) in central Ukraine. It is located in the Stara Synyava Raion (district) of the Khmelnytskyi Oblast (province), by the river Ikva.

== History ==
The village was founded under the name of "Pyliavtsi". In 1648, as part of the Khmelnytskyi Uprising, the settlement became the scene of a decisive battle, which resulted in the victory of the Tatar-backed Cossack forces over troops loyal to the Polish-Lithuanian Commonwealth.

== Demographics ==
As of the 2001 Ukrainian census, Pyliava had a population of 672 residents. The distribution of the population by their native languages was as follows:

Native languages in Pyliava
	percent
Ukrainian	99.7%
Russian	0.3%
others	0.0%

== See also ==
- Battle of Pyliavtsi
