= Jeremi Wiśniowiecki =

Polish politician (1612–1651)

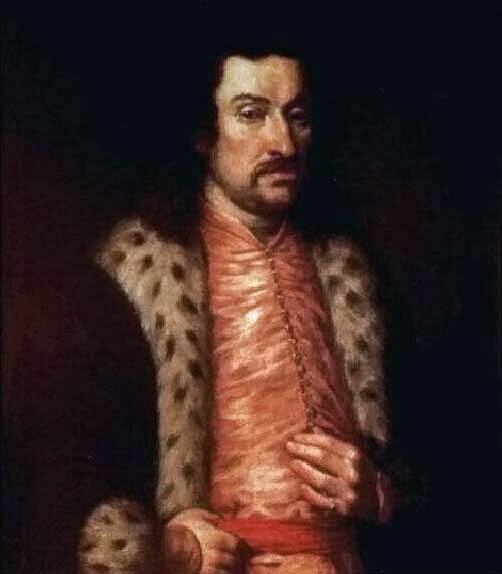
- Portrait by Daniel Schultz

- Coat of arms
- Full name: Jeremi Michał Korybut Wiśniowiecki
- Born: 1612; Lubny, Kyiv Voivodship, Polish–Lithuanian Commonwealth (possibly)
- Died: 20 August 1651 (aged 38–39); Pawołocz, Polish–Lithuanian Commonwealth
- Noble family: Wiśniowiecki
- Spouse: Gryzelda Konstancja Zamoyska (m. 1639)
- Issue: Michał Korybut Wiśniowiecki
- Father: Michał Wiśniowiecki
- Mother: Regina Mohyła (Raina Mohylanka)

Prince Jeremi Michał Korybut Wiśniowiecki (Note: Ukrainian: Єремія-Михайло Вишневецький; also known as Yarema Vyshnevetsky (Ukrainian: Ярема Вишневецький, Polish: Jarema Wiśniowiecki)), nicknamed Hammer on the Cossacks (Polish: Młot na Kozaków), was a notable member of the aristocracy of the Polish–Lithuanian Commonwealth, Prince of Vyshnivets, Lubny and Khorol in the Crown of the Kingdom of Poland and the father of the future King of Poland, Michael I.

A notable magnate and military commander of Ruthenian and Moldavian origin, Wiśniowiecki was heir of one of the biggest fortunes of the state and rose to several notable dignities, including the position of voivode of the Ruthenian Voivodship (today southeastern Poland and western Ukraine) in 1646. His conversion from Eastern Orthodoxy to Roman Catholicism caused much dissent in Ruthenian lands of the Polish–Lithuanian Commonwealth. Wiśniowiecki was a successful military leader as well as one of the wealthiest magnates of Poland, ruling over lands inhabited by 230,000 people.

A charismatic leader and skilled military commander, Wiśniowiecki became famous for his decisive and frequently cruel actions during the Khmelnytsky Uprising, in the course of which he achieved several victories against rebellious Zaporozhian Cossacks and engaged in a campaign of terror against their perceived supporters around Ukraine. He died during one of anti-Cossack campaigns in 1651. His son Michał Korybut Wiśniowiecki would later become King of Poland and Grand Duke of Lithuania.

== Biography ==
=== Youth ===
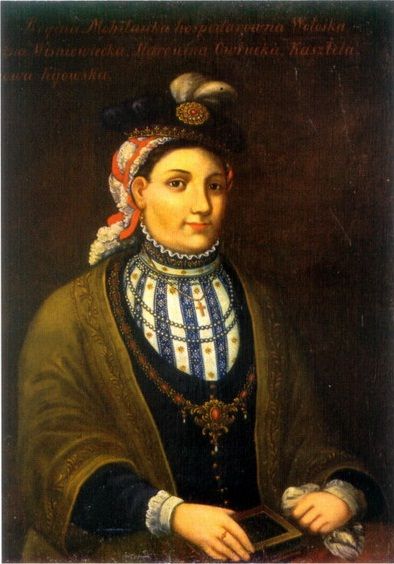
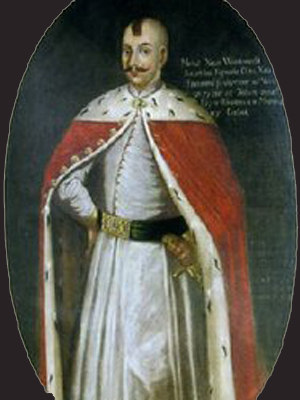
Jeremi's parents Regina Mohyła and Michał Wiśniowiecki

Jeremi Michał Korybut Wiśniowiecki was born in 1612; neither the exact date nor the place of his birth are known. His father, Michał Wiśniowiecki, of the Ruthenian Wiśniowiecki family, died soon after Jeremi's birth, in 1616. His mother, Regina Mohyła (Raina Mohylanka) was a Moldavian-born noblewoman of the Movilești family, daughter of the Moldavian prince Ieremia Movilă, Jeremi's namesake; she died in 1619. Both of his parents were of the Eastern Orthodox Church rite. Jeremi's mother was the first cousin of Petro Mohyla, the influential Orthodox theologian and metropolitan of Kyiv.

Orphaned at the age of seven, Wiśniowiecki was raised by his uncle, Konstanty Wiśniowiecki, whose branch of the family were Roman Catholics. Jeremi attended a Jesuit college in Lviv and later, in 1629, he traveled to Italy, where he briefly attended the University of Bologna. He also acquired some military experience in the Netherlands. The upbringing by his uncle and the trips abroad polonized him, and turned him into one of the youngest magnates of Poland and Lithuania.

In 1631 Wiśniowiecki returned to the Commonwealth and took over from his uncle the management of his father's huge estate, which included a large part of what is now Ukraine. In 1632 he converted from Eastern Orthodoxy to Catholicism, an action that caused much concern in Ukraine. His decision has been analyzed by historians, and often criticized, particularly in Ukrainian historiography. The Orthodox Church feared losing a powerful protector, and Isaiah Kopinsky, metropolitan bishop of Kyiv and a friend of his mother, unsuccessfully pleaded with him to change his mind. Jeremi would not budge although he remained on decent terms with the Orthodox Church, avoiding provocative actions, and supported his uncle and Orthodox bishop Petro Mohyla and his Orthodox Church collegium.

=== Military and political career ===
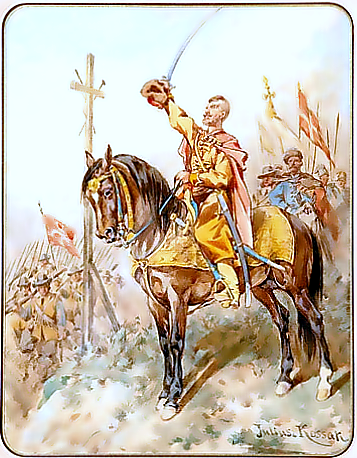
Jeremi Wiśniowiecki by Juliusz Kossak

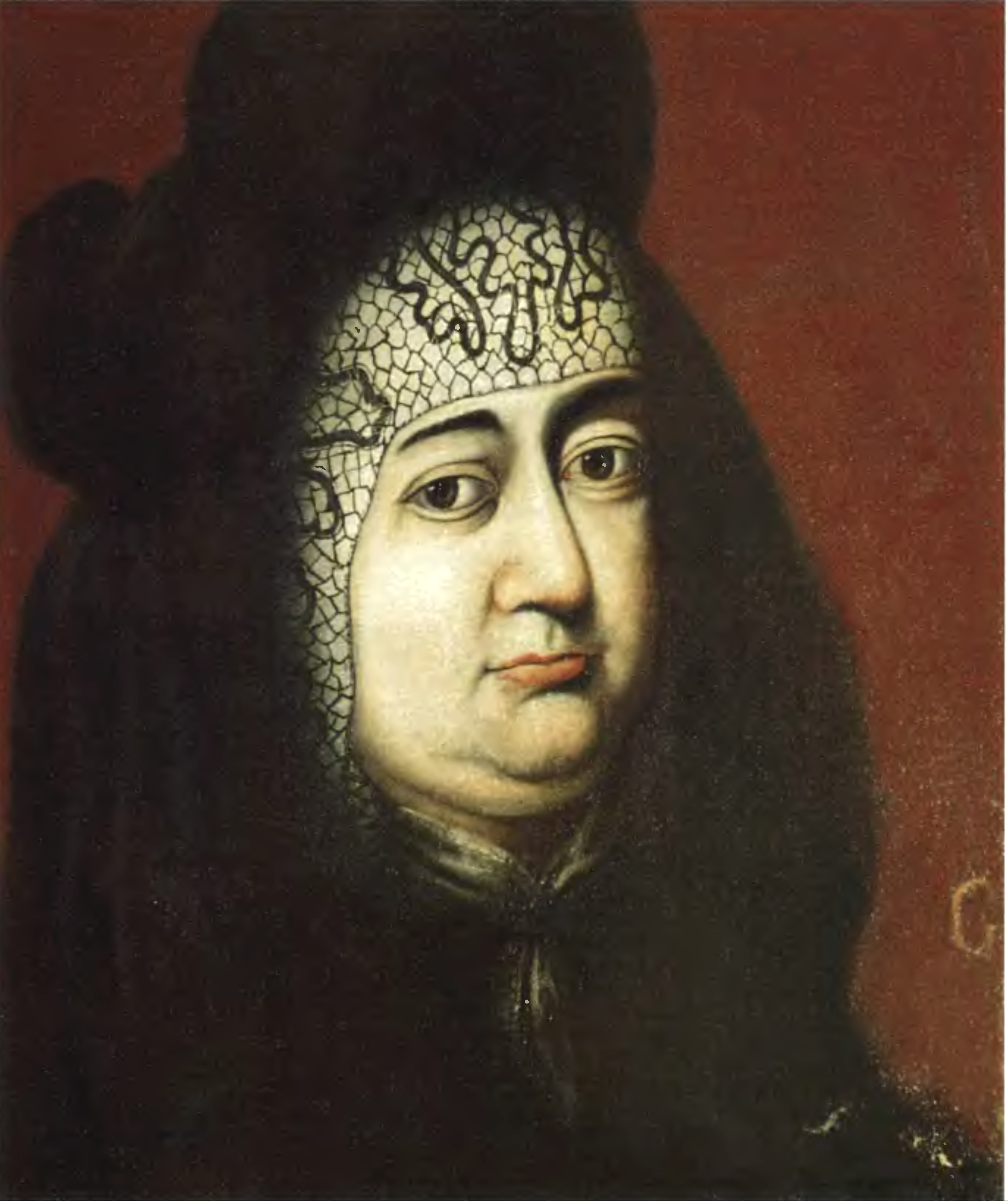
Princess Gryzelda Wiśniowiecka

Wiśniowiecki's courtier and first biographer, Michał Kałyszowski, counted that Jeremi participated in nine wars in his lifetime. The first of these was the Smolensk Campaign of 1633–34 against the Tsardom of Russia. In that war he accompanied castellan Aleksander Piaseczyński's southern army and took part in several battles, among them the unsuccessful siege of Putyvl; later that year they took Rylsk and Sevsk before retreating. The following year he worked with Adam Kisiel and Łukasz Żółkiewski, commanding his own private army of 4,000. As his troops formed two thirds of their army (not counting supporting Cossack elements), Jeremi, despite being the most junior of commanders, had much influence over their campaign. Lacking in artillery, they failed to take any major towns, but ravaged the countryside near Sevsk and Kursk. The war ended soon afterward, and in May 1634 he returned to Lubny. For his service, he received a commendation from the King of Poland, Władysław IV Vasa, and the castellany of Kyiv.

After the war Wiśniowiecki engaged in a number of conflicts with neighbouring magnates and nobles. Jeremi was able to afford a sizable private army of several thousands, and through the threat of it he was often able to force his neighbours to a favourable settlement of disputes. Soon after his return from the Russian front, he participated on the side of the Dowmont family in the quarrel over the estate of Dowmontów against another magnate, Samuel Łaszcz, located on his lands; soon after the victorious battle against Łaszcz he bought the lands from the Dowmonts and incorporated them into his estates.

Around 1636 the Sejm (Polish–Lithuanian parliament) opposed the marriage of King Władysław IV Vasa to Wiśniowiecki's sister, Anna. Following this, Jeremi distanced himself from the royal court, although he periodically returned to Warsaw, usually as one of the deputies to the Sejm from the Ruthenian Voivodeship (today southeastern Poland and western Ukraine). Soon afterward, Jeremi himself married Gryzelda Zamoyska, daughter of Chancellor Tomasz Zamoyski, on 27 February 1639, Gryzelda's 16th birthday.

At that time Wiśniowiecki also engaged in a political conflict over titles of nobility, in particular, the title of prince (kniaź). The nobility in the Commonwealth was officially equal, and used different and non-hereditary titles than those found in rest of the world (see officials of the Polish–Lithuanian Commonwealth); the gist of the conflict, which took much of the Sejm's time around 1638–41, revolved around whether old princely titles (awarded to families before their lands were incorporated into the Commonwealth in the 1569 Union of Lublin), and new titles, awarded more recently by some foreign courts, should be recognized. Wiśniowiecki was one of the chief participants in this debate, successfully defending the old titles, including that of his own family, and succeeding in abolishing the new titles, which gained him the enmity of another powerful magnate, Jerzy Ossoliński. Other than this conflict, in his years as a deputy (1635–46), Jeremi was not involved in any major political issues, and only twice (in 1640 and 1642) did he serve in the minor function of a commissar for investigating the eastern and southern border disputes.

In 1637 Wiśniowiecki might have fought under Hetman Mikołaj Potocki against the Cossack rebellion of Pavlo Pavliuk (the Pavliuk uprising); Jan Widacki notes that historians are not certain whether he did and in either case, no detailed accounts of his possible participation survive. A year later, returning from the Sejm and from the engagement ceremony with Gryzelda, he gathered a 4,000 strong division that participated in putting down of the Ostryanyn uprising and arrived at the region affected by the unrest in June that year. Together with Hetman Potocki he defeated the insurgents at the Battle of Zhovnyn, which turned into a rather difficult siege of the Cossack camp that lasted from 13 June till the Cossack relief forces were defeated on 4 August, and the Cossacks capitulated on 7 August.

=== Political rise ===
In 1641, after the death of his uncle Konstanty Wiśniowiecki, Jeremi became the last adult male of the Wiśniowiecki family and inherited all the remaining estates of the clan, despite a brief conflict with Aleksander Ludwik Radziwiłł who also claimed the inherited land. The conflict stemmed from the fact that Konstanty asked Jeremi to take care of his grandchildren, but their mother, Katarzyna Eugenia Tyszkiewicz, married Aleksander, who declared himself able and willing to take care of her children – and their estates. A year later, Katarzyna Eugenia decided to divorce Aleksander, and the matter was settled in favor of Jeremi.

Wiśniowiecki also fought against the Tatars in 1640–46, whose raids on the south-east frontier of the Commonwealth endangered his holdings. In 1644 together with Hetman Stanisław Koniecpolski he took part in the victorious Battle of Ochmatów, in which they crushed forces of Crimean Tatars led by Toğay bey (Tuhaj Bej).

In 1644, after the false news of the death of Adam Kazanowski, Wiśniowiecki took over his disputed estate of Rumno by subterfuge. For this he was at first sentenced to exile, but due to his influence, even the King could not realistically expect to enforce this ruling without a civil war. Eventually after more discussions at local sejmiks and then in the Sejm, he won the case and was granted the right for Rumno. In 1646, after the death of Koniecpolski, he became the voivode of Ruthenia. He invaded and took over the town of Hadiach which was also being claimed by a son of Koniecpolski, Aleksander Koniecpolski, but a year later, in 1647, he lost that case and was forced to return the town.

Wiśniowiecki's position as voivode of Ruthenia gave him a seat in the Senate, the upper chamber of the Sejm. He was the third member of the Wiśniowiecki family to gain that privilege. Soon afterward, however, he refused to support King Władysław's plan for a war against the Ottoman Empire, even though the King offered him the rank of a Field Crown Hetman.

In the autumn of 1646, Wiśniowiecki invaded and took over the position of starost of Kaniv, vacated recently by the banished Samuel Łaszcz. He did so without any legal justifications, which caused a court ruling against him, which was, however, never enforced. Later that year, he raised a large private army of about 25,000 for an unknown purpose, as noted by Widacki, who writes that the army, which Jeremi raised at an immense cost for a short time, did not participate in any engagement, nor did it have any clear purpose. He notes that such an army might have been useful in provoking the Ottomans, but as Jeremi was opposed to the war with them up to the point of refusing the office of hetman, his actions are puzzling even for modern historians.

A rich heir and one of the most powerful magnates of the Polish-Lithuanian Commonwealth, Wiśniowiecki was one of the last princes to base their claims on power over Ruthenia upon dynastic grounds. His view of his own status as "first among equals" in Commonwealth politics was demonstrated in 1647, when, following a perceived insult to the prince's dignity, Wiśniowiecki's army of 4,000 men surrounded the seat of the Chamber of Deputies, threatening to fight anyone who would go against his will, "even the king". This scandal was settled only after the intervention of mediators.

=== Khmelnytsky uprising ===
==== Initial retreat ====
Wiśniowiecki fought against the Cossacks again during the Khmelnytsky Uprising in 1648–51. At the time of the outbreak of the revolt he was staying in Lubny, and he began mobilizing his troops after receiving information about the growing unrest. In early May the prince learned about the Cossack victory at the Battle of Zhovti Vody. Receiving no orders from Hetmans Mikołaj Potocki and Marcin Kalinowski, he began moving on his own, soon learning about the second Cossack victory at Battle of Korsuń, which meant that his troops (about 6,000 strong) were the only Polish forces in Transdnieper at that moment. After taking in the situation, he began retreating towards Chernihiv; his army soon became a focal point for various refugees. Passing Chernihiv, he continued through Liubech to Brahin.

A sworn enemy of the rebels, whom he called "ungrateful rabble", in Liubech Yarema publicly declared that it would be better to die than to live under the rule of "pagans and idlers". He continued to Mazyr, Zhytomir, and Pohrebyshche, stopping briefly in Zhytomir for the local sejmik. On his way across the region, Wiśniowiecki's troops left a trail of destruction, exacting vengeance on perceived rebel supporters for the murder of Poles and Jews during the uprising. During Wiśniowiecki's campaign, people suspected of sympathy to the Cossack insurgents were put on stakes, hanged, beheaded, blinded and had their arms cut off. After some skirmishes near Nemyriv, Makhnivka and Starokostiantyniv (Battle of Starokostiantyniv) against the Cossack forces, by July he arrived near Zbarazh, where the Crown Army was gathering at the time.

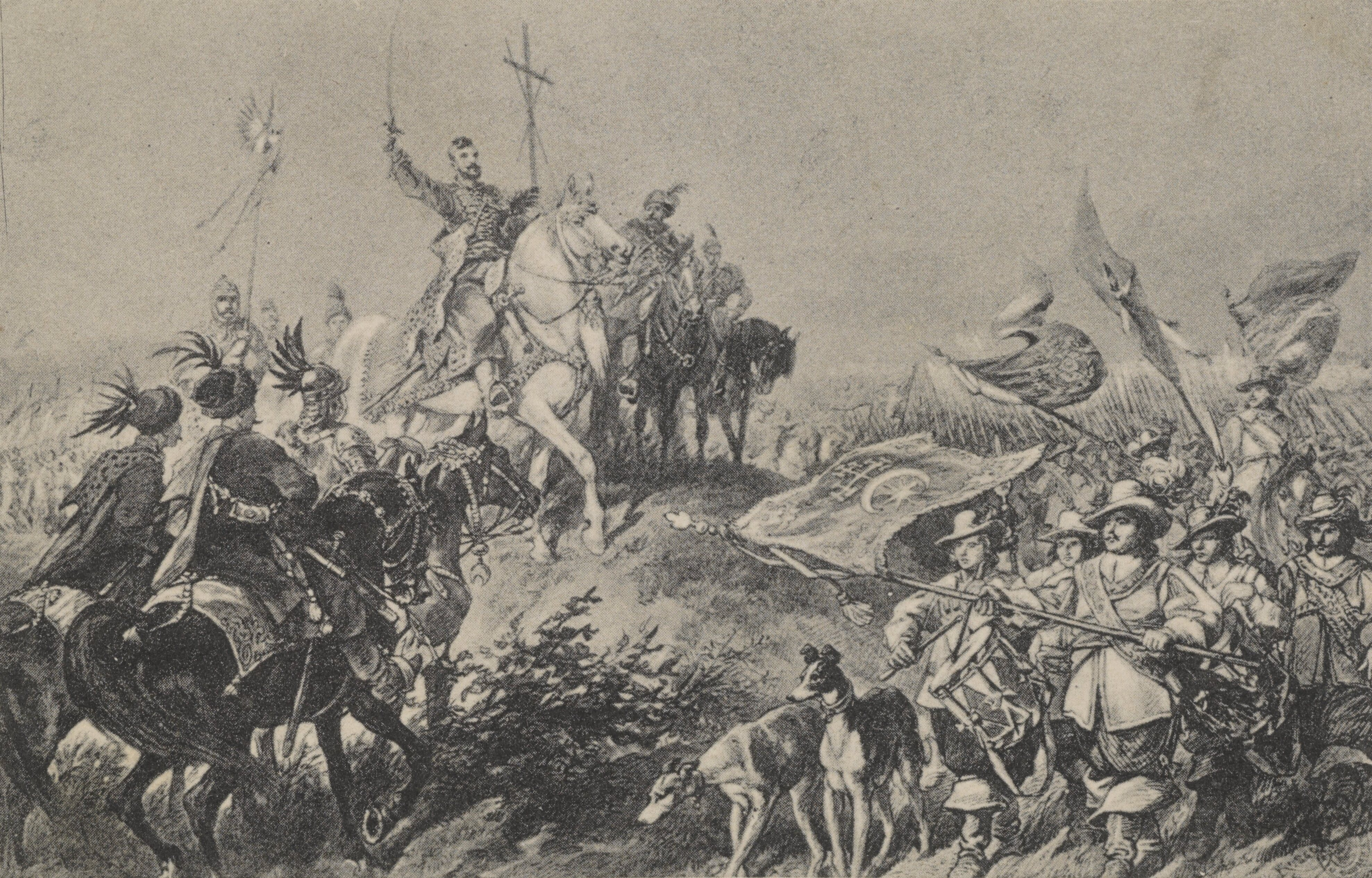
Prince Jeremi Wiśniowiecki in Lubny in 1648, by Juliusz Kossak

Wiśniowiecki's fighting retreat had a major impact on the course of the war. In the words of the historian Władysław Konopczyński, "he was neither defeated, nor victorious, and thus he made the peace more difficult." Politicians in Warsaw tried to negotiate with the Cossacks, who in turn used Wiśniowiecki's actions as an excuse to delay any serious negotiations.

==== Commander of Crown forces ====
Around late August or early September, Wiśniowiecki met with the army commanders (regimentarze) Władysław Dominik Zasławski-Ostrogski, Mikołaj Ostroróg and Aleksander Koniecpolski. He was not on overly friendly terms with them, as he resented being passed over in military nominations, but after short negotiations, he agreed to follow their orders. Though he was thus reduced to the status of a junior commander, this had little impact on the next phase of the campaign. On 23 September, their forces were, however, defeated at the Battle of Pyliavtsi; near the end of the battle some accounts suggest Wiśniowiecki was offered the hetman's position, but refused. On 29 September in Lviv, the surviving commanders and remnants of the Polish forces from the Battle of Pyliavtsi elected Jeremi Wiśniowiecki as field regimentarz, with Mikołaj Ostroróg appointed as his deputy. At that time, approximately 4,400–6,000 armed men remained under their command, while a much larger number of inhabitants and refugees gradually left the city.

A decision was made to organize the defence of Lviv through an emergency collection of funds, which soon brought in around 900,000 zlotys along with a large quantity of valuables. However, following reports of the approaching forces of Bohdan Khmelnytsky, Wiśniowiecki and Ostroróg, together with part of the accompanying group, secretly left the city on 5 October, taking the entire collected funds with them. Responsibility for the defence of Lviv was transferred to the burgomaster Marcin Grosweyer. Amidst the siege of Zamość, the Sejm appointed Wiśniowiecki temporary commander of the pospolite ruszenie. In the end, the cities were not captured by the Cossacks, who in the light of the coming winter decided to retreat, after being paid a ransom by both town councils; no other large field battle took place that year.

Meanwhile, the convocation sejm of 1648 had elected a new king, Jan Kazimierz II Vasa. Wiśniowiecki supported other candidates, such as George I Rákóczi and Karol Ferdynand Vasa (Jan Kazimierz's brother). Due to the opposition from Jeremi's detractors, he was not made a hetman, although after a full two days of debate on the subject he was granted a document that stated he had a "power equal to that of a hetman." Wiśniowiecki's faction, arguing for an increase in army size, was once again marginalized by the faction that hoped for a peaceful resolution. In the end, the King and most of the szlachta were lulled into a false sense of security, and the military was not reinforced significantly. In addition, the coronation sejm of January–February 1649, held in Kraków, revoked Wiśniowiecki's regimentarz rank.

In the first half of 1649, the negotiations with the Cossacks fell through, and the Polish–Lithuanian military began gathering near the borders with Ukraine. A major camp was in Zbarazh, where Wiśniowiecki would arrive as well in late June, after gathering a new army of 3,000 in Wiśnicz, which was all he was able to afford at that time, due to most of his estates being overrun by the Cossacks. Wiśniowiecki's arrival raised the morale of the royal army, and despite having no official rank, both the common soldiers and the new regimentarz promised to take his advice and even offered him the official command (which he refused). During the siege of Zbarazh, Wiśniowiecki was thus not the official commander (role was taken by regimentarz Andrzej Firlej) but most historians agree he was the de facto commander of the Polish–Lithuanian army. The siege would last until the ceasefire of the Treaty of Zboriv. Wiśniowiecki's command during the siege was seen as phenomenal, and his popularity among the troops and nobility rose again; however, the King, still not fond of him, gave him a relatively small reward (the Starostwo of Przasnysz, much less compared to several others he distributed around that time). Needing Wiśniowiecki's support in December that year, the King granted him once again a temporary hetman nomination, and several more land grants. In April 1650, Wiśniowiecki had to return his temporary hetman office to Mikołaj Potocki, recently released from Cossack's captivity. During December that year, in light of the growing tensions with Muscovy, Wiśniowiecki's military faction succeeded in convincing the Sejm to pass a resolution increasing the size of the army to 51,000, the largest army since the Cossack unrest began two years earlier.

==== Last victory and death ====
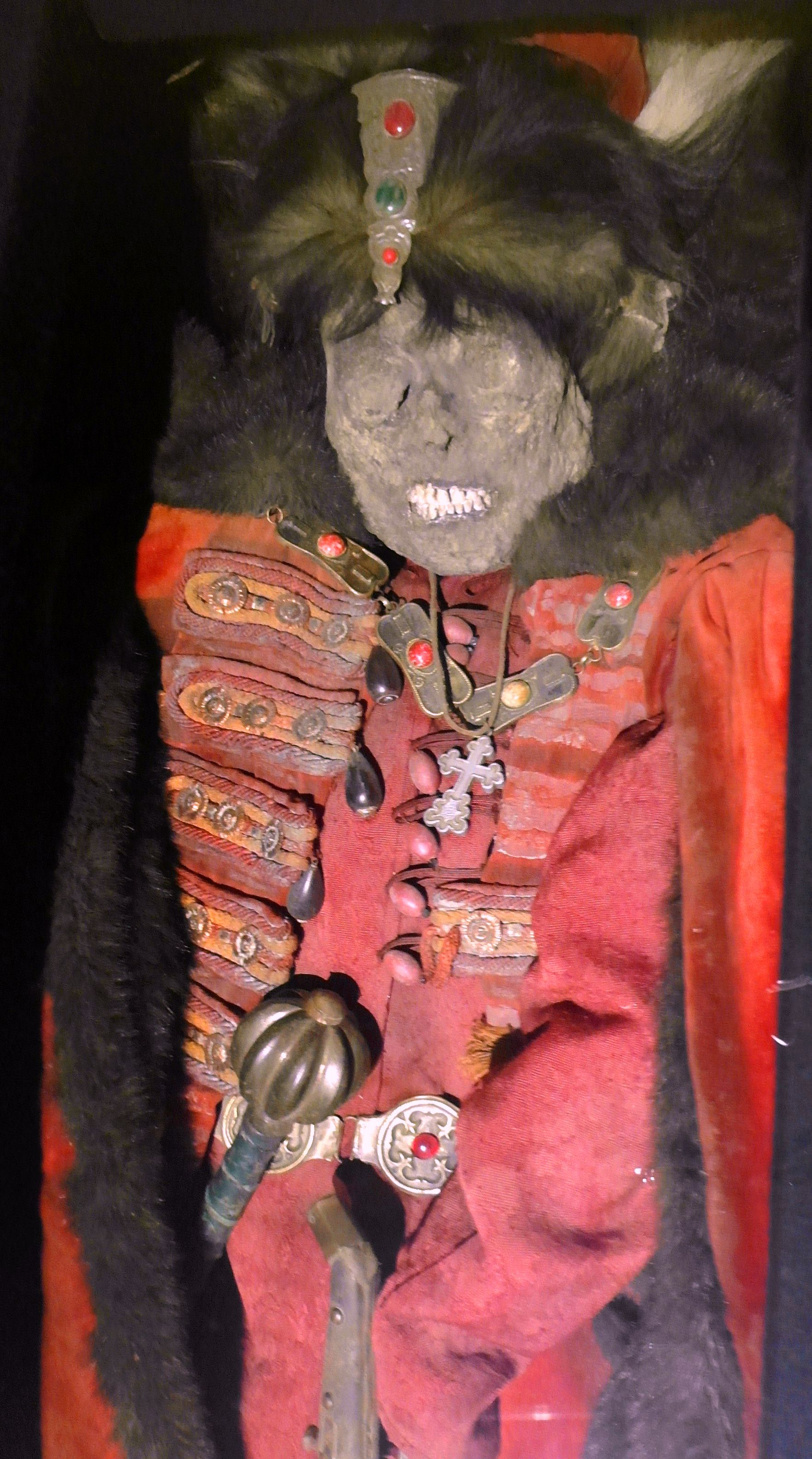
Alleged corpse of Jeremi Wiśniowiecki in Holy Cross Monastery, Poland

The truce of Zboriv did not last long, and in the spring of 1651 Khmelnytsky's Cossacks began advancing west again. On 1 June 1651 Wiśniowiecki brought his private army to face the Cossacks in Sokal. He commanded the left wing of the Polish–Lithuanian army in the victorious Battle of Berestechko on 28–30 June . The Polish–Lithuanian army advanced after the retreating Cossacks, but on 17 July the King "left the whole army to Potocki ... and having given the order that the army march into Ukraine, the King himself parted ... to Warsaw to celebrate his victories over the Cossacks." Later that year, on 14 August, Wiśniowiecki suddenly fell ill while in a camp near the village of Pawołocz, and died on 20 August 1651, at the age of only 39. His cause of death was never known, while some (even contemporaries) speculated he was poisoned, but no conclusive evidence to support such a claim have ever been found. Based on sparse descriptions of his illness and subsequent investigations, some medical historians suggest the cause of death might have been a disease related to cholera. However, one account states, "following a cheerful conversation with other officers who had congregated for a military council in his tent on Sunday 13 August N.S. he had eaten some cucumbers with zest and washed them down with mead, and from that contracted dysentery. After lying ill for a week, he died there, at Pavoloch". He was given a "ceremonial funeral with the entire army present. On 22 August Wiśniowiecki's body was seen off with the utmost pomp on its journey to his residence".

Wiśniowiecki's indebted family was not able to provide him with a funeral his rank and fame deserved. In the end, he never received the large funeral and the temporary location of his body, the monastery of the Holy Cross at Łysa Góra, became his final resting place. His body was believed lost in a fire at the end of the 18th century, which would prevent a modern reexamination of the cause of his death, although a body purported to be his had been discovered by Oblates in 1936. In the interwar period, the authenticity was questioned by the magnate's biographer, Władysław Tomkiewicz, who argued that the body had been burned in a fire in 1777. Forensic examination in 1980 showed that the body belonged to another person, who was taller and died at a more advanced age than Wiśniowiecki. No traces of the autopsy performed in the 17th century were found; however, it is likely that this person lived in the same historical period and their corpse was kept on display in the monastery as Wiśniowiecki.

== Wealth ==
Magnate possessions in the Commonwealth before the Khmelnytsky Uprising; the lands owned by Wiśniowiecki family and their close relatives are shown in red

The majority of the Wiśniowiecki family estates were found on the eastern side of the Dnieper River (Volhynian, Ruthenian and Kyiv Voivodeships), and most of them were acquired by Jeremi's grandfather, Aleksander Wiśniowiecki, in the 16th century. The capital of his estate was located at a fortified manor at Lubny, where his father rebuilt an old castle; the population of the town itself has been estimated at 1,000. Wiśniowiecki inherited lands inhabited, according to an estimate from 1628, by about 4,500 people, of which Lubny was the largest town. Smaller towns in his lands included Khorol, Pyriatyn and Pryluky. By 1646 his lands were inhabited by 230,000 people. The number of towns on his lands rose from several to about thirty, and their population increased as well. The prosperity of those lands reflected Wiśniowiecki's skills in economic management, and the income from his territories (estimated at 600,000 złotys yearly) made him one of the wealthiest magnates in the Commonwealth. Because of its size and relatively consistent borders, Wiśniowiecki's estate was often named Wiśniowieczczyzna ("Wiśniowieckiland").

Despite his wealth, he was not known to live a lavish life. His court of about a hundred people was not known for being overly extravagant, he built no luxurious residences, and did not even have a single portrait of himself made during his life. It is uncertain how Wiśniowiecki looked, although a number of portraits and other works depicting him exist. Jan Widacki notes that much of the historiography concerning Wiśniowiecki focuses on the military and political aspects of his life, and few of his critics discuss his successes in the economic development of his estates.

== Remembrance and popular culture ==
Wiśniowiecki was widely popular among the noble class, who saw in him a defender of tradition, a patriot and an able military commander. He was praised by many of his contemporaries, including a poet, Samuel Twardowski, as well as numerous diary writers and early historians. For his protection of civilians, including Jews, during the Uprising, Wiśniowiecki has been commended by early Jewish historians. Until the 19th century, he was idolized as the legendary, perfect "knight of the borderlands"; his sculpture is among the twenty sculptures of famous historical figures in the 18th-century "Knight Room" of the Royal Castle in Warsaw.

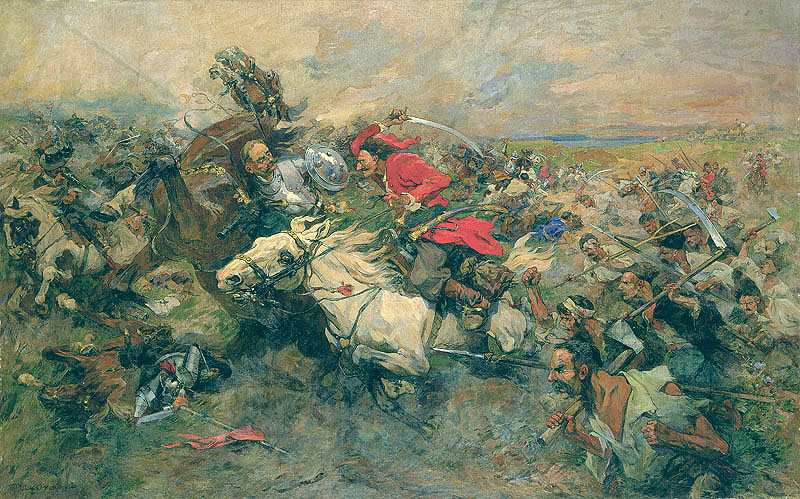
Combat between Vyshnevetsky (left) and Cossack leader Maksym Kryvonis in a 1934 painting by Mykola Samokysh

In the 19th century this image started to waver, as a new wave in historiography began to reinterpret Wiśniowiecki's life, and as the era of positivism in Poland put more value on builders and less on warriors. Further, at that time Polish historians began to question the traditional view of the "Ukrainian problem" and the way that the Polish noble class had dealt with the Cossacks. Various aspects of Wiśniowiecki's life and personality were questioned and criticized in the work of historians such as Karol Szajnocha and Józef Szujski.

According to a legend, before dying Wiśniowiecki's mother warned him against converting to Catholicism and abandoning the faith of his ancestors; his conversion despite her warning was believed to have put a curse on the whole family, leading to his premature death.

Wiśniowiecki is a major secondary character in Henryk Sienkiewicz's historical novel With Fire and Sword, set during the Khmelnytsky Uprising. While Sienkiewicz's portrayal of Wiśniowiecki is rather positive, criticism of the latter's persona intensified, in particular from Sienkiewicz detractors such as Zygmunt Kaczkowski and Olgierd Górka. The 1930s saw a first modern historical work about Wiśniowiecki, by Władysław Tomkiewicz. In the era of the People's Republic of Poland, the Communist Party's ideology dictated that all historians present Wiśniowiecki as an "enemy of the people", although this began to be relaxed after 1965. Widacki, analyzing the work of other historians, notes that Władysław Czapliński was rather sympathetic to Wiśniowiecki, while Paweł Jasienica was critical of him. Andrzej Seweryn played Jeremi Wiśniowiecki in the 1999 film With Fire and Sword.

Wiśniowiecki was the main subject of one of Jacek Kaczmarski's 1993 songs Kniazia Jaremy nawrócenie (The Conversion of Knyaz Jarema).

== See also ==
- Lithuanian nobility
- List of szlachta

== Sources ==
- Hrushevsky, Mykhailo (2004). History of Ukraine-Rus': The Cossack Age, 1654–1657. Edmonton: Canadian Institute of Ukrainian Studies Press. ISBN 1-895571-22-7.
- Lerski, Jerzy Jan; Wróbel, Piotr; Kozicki, Richard J. (1996). Historical Dictionary of Poland, 966-1945. Greenwood Publishing. ISBN 978-0-313-26007-0.
- Romański, Romuald (2009). Książę Jeremi Wiśniowiecki. Bellona. ISBN 978-83-11-11524-8.
- Widacki, Jan (1984). Kniaź Jarema (in Polish). Wydawnictwo "Slask". ISBN 978-83-216-0440-4.
- Yakovenko, Natalia (2006). Narys istoriï serednʹovichnoï ta rannʹomodernoï Ukraïny Нарис історії середньовічної та ранньомодерної України [An Outline History of Medieval and Early Modern Ukraine] (in Ukrainian) (3rd revised and enlarged ed.). Kyiv: Krytyka. ISBN 9789667679828.
