= Maksym Kryvonis =

Ukrainian Cossack

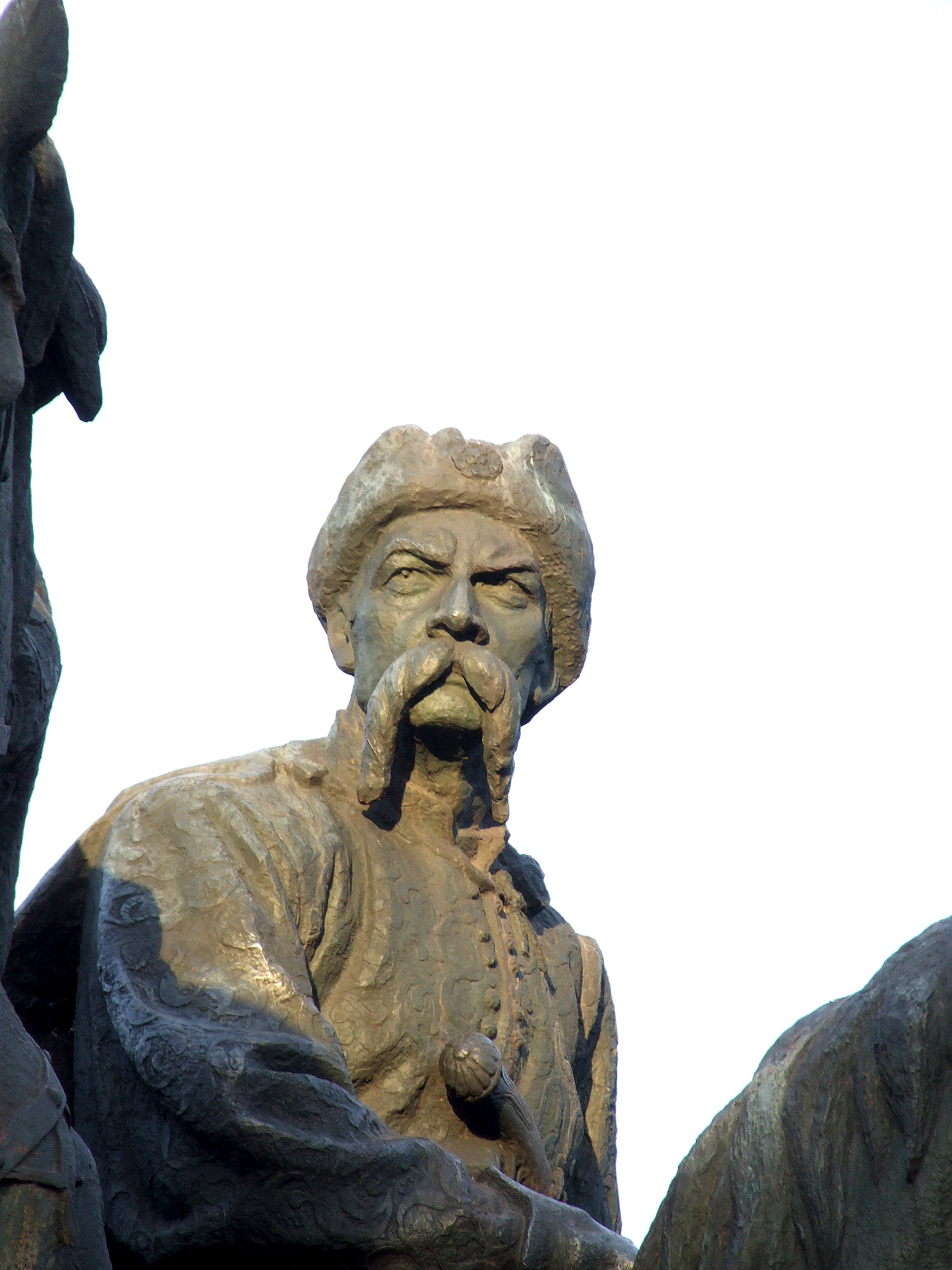
- Statue of Kryvonis in the monument “Heroes of the Liberation War of the Ukrainian People 1648–1654” in Zhovti Vody
- Born: Around 1600
- Died: November 1648; Zamość, Belz Voivodeship, Polish–Lithuanian Commonwealth
- Children: Oleksandr Kryvonosenko
- Military career
- Allegiance: Zaporozhian Host
- Service years: 1648
- Rank: Colonel
- Nickname: Perebyinis
- Commands: Lysianka Regiment; Cherkasy Regiment; Korsun Regiment; Bila Tserkva Regiment; Uman Regiment
- Conflicts: See list: Khmelnytsky Uprising; Khmelnytsky's campaign; Battle of Zhovti Vody; Battle of Korsun; Battle of Makhnivka; Battle of Kostiantyniv; Battle of Pyliavtsi; Siege of Lwów (1648); Siege of Vysokyi Zamok; Siege of Bar (1648); Siege of Kamianets (1648); Siege of Kremenets; Siege of Zamość (1648) #

Maksym Kryvonis (Ukrainian: Максим Кривоніс, Polish: Maksym Krzywonos; literally means "crooked-nose") was one of the Cossack leaders and a commander of the Ukrainian peasants against the Polish–Lithuanian Commonwealth. For the first time in the history of Lviv, during the siege of the city his regiment captured the Vysokyi Zamok Castle, which was defended by the strong Polish–Lithuanian garrison. Kryvonis was one of the most important figures during the Khmelnytskyi Uprising in 1648.

== Origins ==
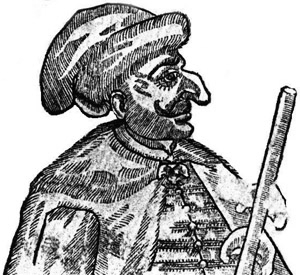
Contemporary woodcut of Kryvonis's likeness (probably a Polish caricature)

The question about his origins remains unresolved. A Polish pamphlet published in 1648 claimed that he was a serf of the Nemyrych family (a hypothesis favoured by Soviet historiography). However, a German source about a meeting with Kryvonis in 1648 says that he is of Scottish origin ("ein gebohrenen Schott"). In this case his real name may well have been not a nickname based on his crooked or broken nose, but a translation of his Scottish family name Cameron.

== Khmelnytsky Uprising ==
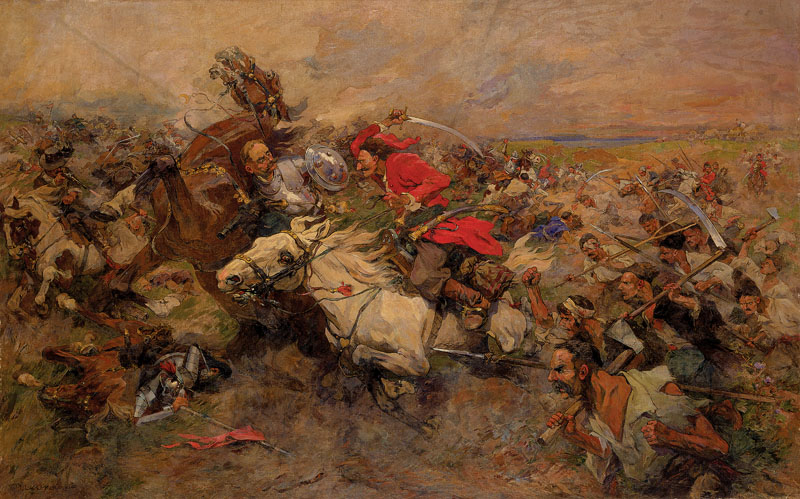
Kryvonis (right on a horse) fighting against Jeremi Wiśniowiecki as depicted on a 1934 painting by Mykola Samokysh

Kryvonis was one of the most effective generals of the uprising. He was awarded the rank of colonel of Cherkasy Regiment. His actions in Korsun and Pylyavtsi battles in 1648 led to crushing Cossack victories over the Polish armies. His actions against prince Jeremi Wiśniowiecki at Makhnivka and Kostiantyniv were also successful.

Kryvonis perished of plague during the siege of Zamość in November 1648.

== Atrocities ==
Cossacks took part in massacres and devastation of the Jewish communities during the uprising. Kryvonis led the capture of Tulchyn, killing 1,500 Jews in process, but sparing Poles in exchange for handing over Jews and their property. Jewish chronicles of that time portray Kryvonis as being responsible for the most brutal attacks on Jews and Poles in 1648. Leonid Plyushch states that Kryvonis's pogroms are often attributed to Bohdan Khmelnytsky.

== Literature ==
Kryvonis (Polish: Maksym Krzywonos) was also a character in With Fire and Sword, a novel by Nobel-winning 19th-century Polish author Henryk Sienkiewicz. In the 1999 movie based on the novel he was played by Maciej Kozłowski.
