= Vchoraishe =

Village in Zhytomyr Oblast, Ukraine

Coordinates: 49°51′54″N 29°08′23″E

Vchoraishe Вчорайше
- Village
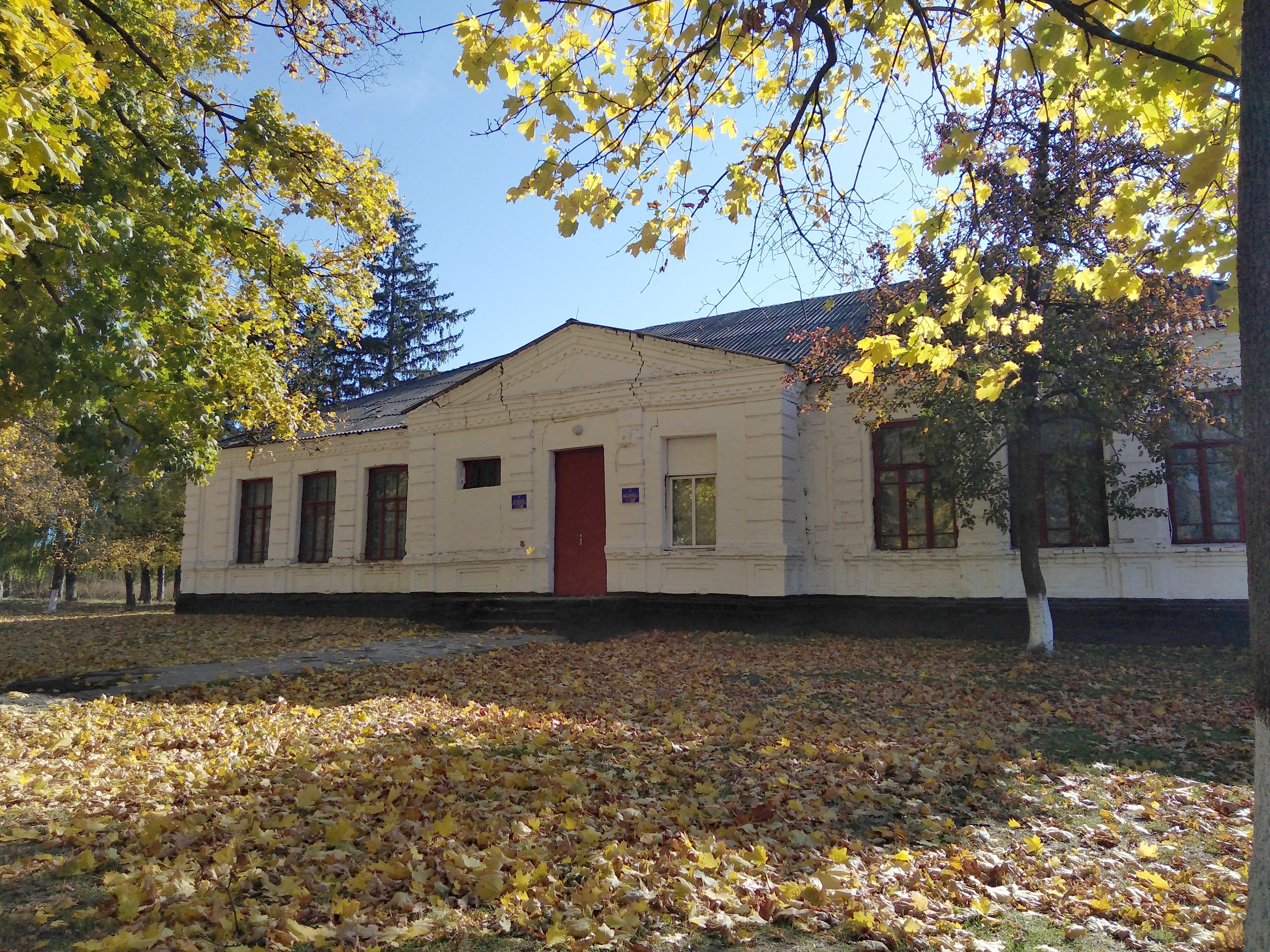
- House of culture and library
- Interactive map of Vchoraishe
- Country: Ukraine
- Oblast: Zhytomyr Oblast
- Raion: Berdychiv Raion
- Hromada: Vchoraishe rural hromada

Area
  - Total: 4.122 km^{2} (1.592 sq mi)

Population
  - Total: 1,308
  - Density: 317.32/km^{2} (821.9/sq mi)
- Postal code: 13610

Vchoraishe (Ukrainian: Вчорайше, Polish: Wczorajsze) is a village in Ukraine, and the administrative centre of the Vchoraishe rural hromada in Berdychiv Raion, Zhytomyr Oblast.
