= Battle of Pyliavtsi =

Battle fought in the Khmelnytsky Uprising

Coordinates: 49.599°N 27.460°E

- Part of the Khmelnytsky Uprising
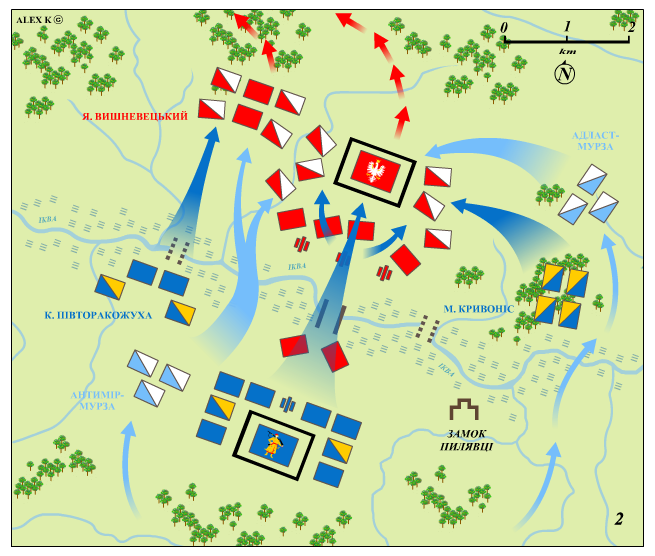
- Attack of the Zaporozhian Cossacks and Crimean Tatars on the Polish–Lithuanian Commonwealth
Date	21–23 September 1648
Location	Pyliavtsi, Podolian Voivodeship, Polish–Lithuanian Commonwealth
Result	Cossack–Tatar victory

Belligerents
Zaporozhian Host; Crimean Khanate	Polish–Lithuanian Commonwealth

Commanders and leaders
Bohdan Khmelnytsky; Tymofiy Khmelnytsky; Maksym Kryvonis; Ivan Bohun; Ivan Sirko; Danylo Nechai; Tugay Bey	Władysław Dominik Zasławski-Ostrogski; Mikołaj Ostroróg; Jeremi Wiśniowiecki; Janusz Tyszkiewicz; Aleksander Koniecpolski

Strength
84,000 (Note: 40,000 Cossacks 40,000 peasants 4,000 Tatars)	~80,000 (Note: 32,000 nobles, infantry and cavalry 8,000 German mercenaries c. 40,000 servants (80,000 total army)); 80 cannons

Casualties and losses
Unknown	15,000 to 40,000 (Note: About half of the Polish–Lithuanian army remained after battle.); All cannons captured

The Battle of Pyliavtsi (Ukrainian: Битва під Пилявцями, Polish: Bitwa pod Piławcami; 21–23 September 1648) was the third significant battle of the Khmelnytsky Uprising. Near the site of the present-day village of Pyliava in Ukraine, a forces of the Zaporozhian Host and Crimean Khanate under the command of Hetman Bohdan Khmelnytsky, Otaman Tymofiy Khmelnytsky, Colonel Maksym Kryvonis and Tugay Bey attacked and decisively defeated the Polish–Lithuanian Commonwealth’s forces under the command of Princes Władysław Dominik Zasławski-Ostrogski and Jeremi Wiśniowiecki, Noblemans Mikołaj Ostroróg and Aleksander Koniecpolski with Magnate Janusz Tyszkiewicz.

== Background ==
At the beginning of the Khmelnytsky Uprising in the early months of 1648, Polish forces tried to suppress it but suffered two defeats at the battle of Zhovti Vody and Korsun. This was followed by the death of king Władysław IV on 20 May 1648, and Chancellor Jerzy Ossolinski called for a congress of notables in Warsaw on 9 June, at which Zaslawski, Ostroróg and Koniecpolski were designated provisional commanders, and Adam Kisiel was instructed to enter into negotiations with Bohdan Khmelnytsky. By 27 June, the Bratslav region, Volhynia and the south Kyiv region were engulfed by the uprising, Khmelnytsky had halted at Bila Tserkva, Tugay Bey foraged with his horde, and the khan had returned to the Crimea with two hundred thousand captives. By August, Kysil's commission had failed and this period of truce was coming to an end.

The Crown Army organized in Galicia, headed by the unpopular triumvirate of Crown commissioners: Władysław Dominik Zasławski, Mikolaj Ostroróg, and Aleksander Koniecpolski, were all famously derided by Bohdan Khmelnytsky as a peryna (the feather-down bed), latyna (the Latinist) and dytyna (the child), respectively. Zaslawski's Army marched to Zbarazh on 16 August 1648, in the footsteps of another Crown Army organized around Jeremi Wisniowiecki, who had been stationed in south Volhynia "following the battles at Starokostiantyniv". These armies merged on 1 September 1648, at Chovhanskyi Kamin.

Bohdan Khmelnytsky was "sationed at the time with his army on the fields of Pyliavtsi southeast of Starokostiantyniv".

An advance regiment commanded by Koniecpolski and Ostroróg crossed the Ikopot River at Rosolivtsi on 6 September 1648, and encountered a Cossack garrison near Starokostiantyniv, who overnight abandoned the town to the Crown Army. Yet, rather than "establishing themselves in..this mighty fortress...they set out to take" Khmelnytsky's position at Pyliavtsi, convinced "he would do anything to avoid a battle" while awaiting the arrival of the Crimean Tatars.

On 8 September 1648, Polish cavalry troops under the command of Mykola Zatsyvilkovsky approached the Cossack positions at Pyliavtsi, driving a Cossack reconnaissance patrol from the field, allowing the Crown Army to camp on the Ikva opposite Khmelnytsky.

== Battle ==
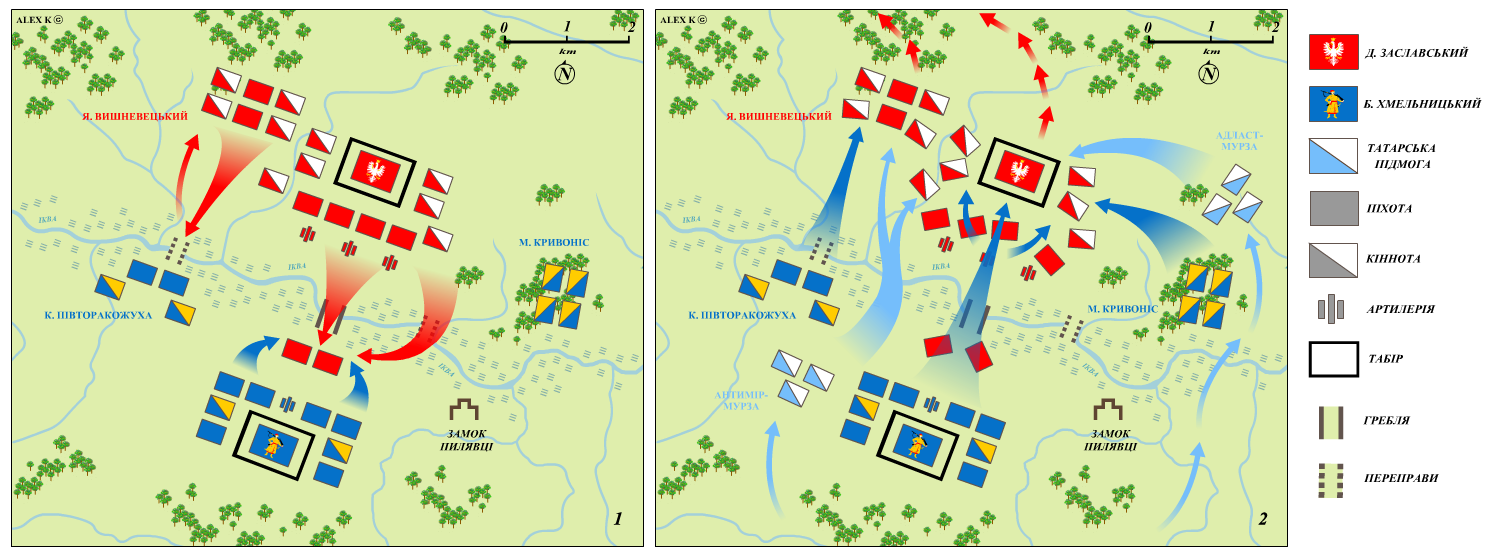
The scheme of the battle

Following several days of minor battles, Khmelnytsky led his army on the morning of 13 September 1648 shouting: “For the faith, brave warriors, for the faith!", killing many Polish cavalrymen as they fled back across the Ikva. That night, the Polish commanders decided to retreat in corral formation to Starokostiantyniv, but while preparing for this retreat the next day, they would hold their position and fight under Wisniowiecki's command. However, "rumours began curculating among the troops ... that the commanders had abandoned the camp and taken flight, and fear was turned into wholesale panic". "Everyone else began to flee, leaving behind wagons, cannon, and all kind of supplies, only the sick and maimed remained", not stopping at Starokostiantyniv, Koniecpolski went to Brody, Ostroróg to Olesko, Zaslawski to Vyshnivets.

== Aftermath ==
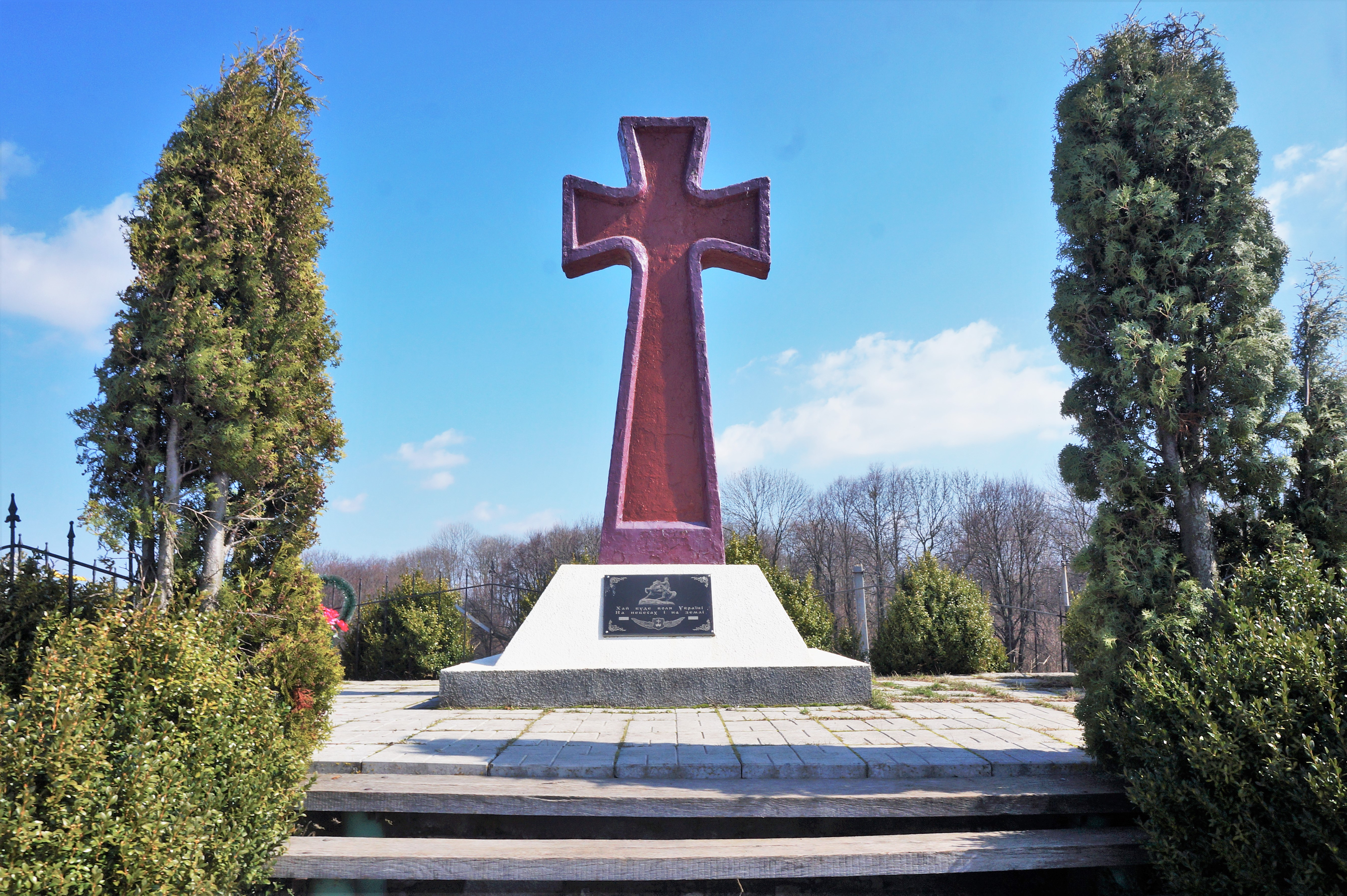
A modern monument to the battle, Ukraine

The Polish–Lithuanian army suffered a «crushing defeat»and was forced into disorganized retreat. The bridge leading to the town gate of Starokostiantyniv collapsed under the weight of retreating Polish–Lithuanian troops, burying hundreds under its debris. Only around half of the Polish–Lithuanian army managed to flee. The Poles left behind an "immense, unheard-of booty", including a hundred thousand loaded wagons, and the "Cossacks then threw themselves, completely unarmed, into looting the camp", which "significantly weakened the victor's desire to launch a pursuit." Even the "Tatar Horde, arriving after the rout, paid no attention to taking prisoners, but applied themselves to keeping the assorted booty". A few days later, Bohdan Khmelnytsky seized Zbarazh, "the residence of the Cossack's greatest enemy, Jeremi Wiśniowiecki", continued on to siege Lviv from 28 September until 15 October 1648, leaving after that city paid 500,000 złoty worth of "money, metal, goods, and supplies" (330,000 went the Tatars). He then laid siege to Zamość on 27 October until 22 November 1648, before receiving 20,000 złotys.

The Polish Sejm convened 26 September 1648 (6 November 1648,) and elected Jeremi Wisniowiecki as Crown Hetman, Andrzej Firlej as Field Hetman, and John II Casimir Vasa as king on 17 November, who sent Jakub Smiarowski to ask Bohdan Khmelnytsky to withdraw "to the usual places". Khmelnytsky departed Zamość on 24 November, the king confirmed Khmelnytsky as hetman in December and Khmelnytsky entered Kyiv before Christmas.
