= Starokostiantyniv =

City in Khmelnytskyi Oblast, Ukraine

Starokostiantyniv Старокостянтинів
- City
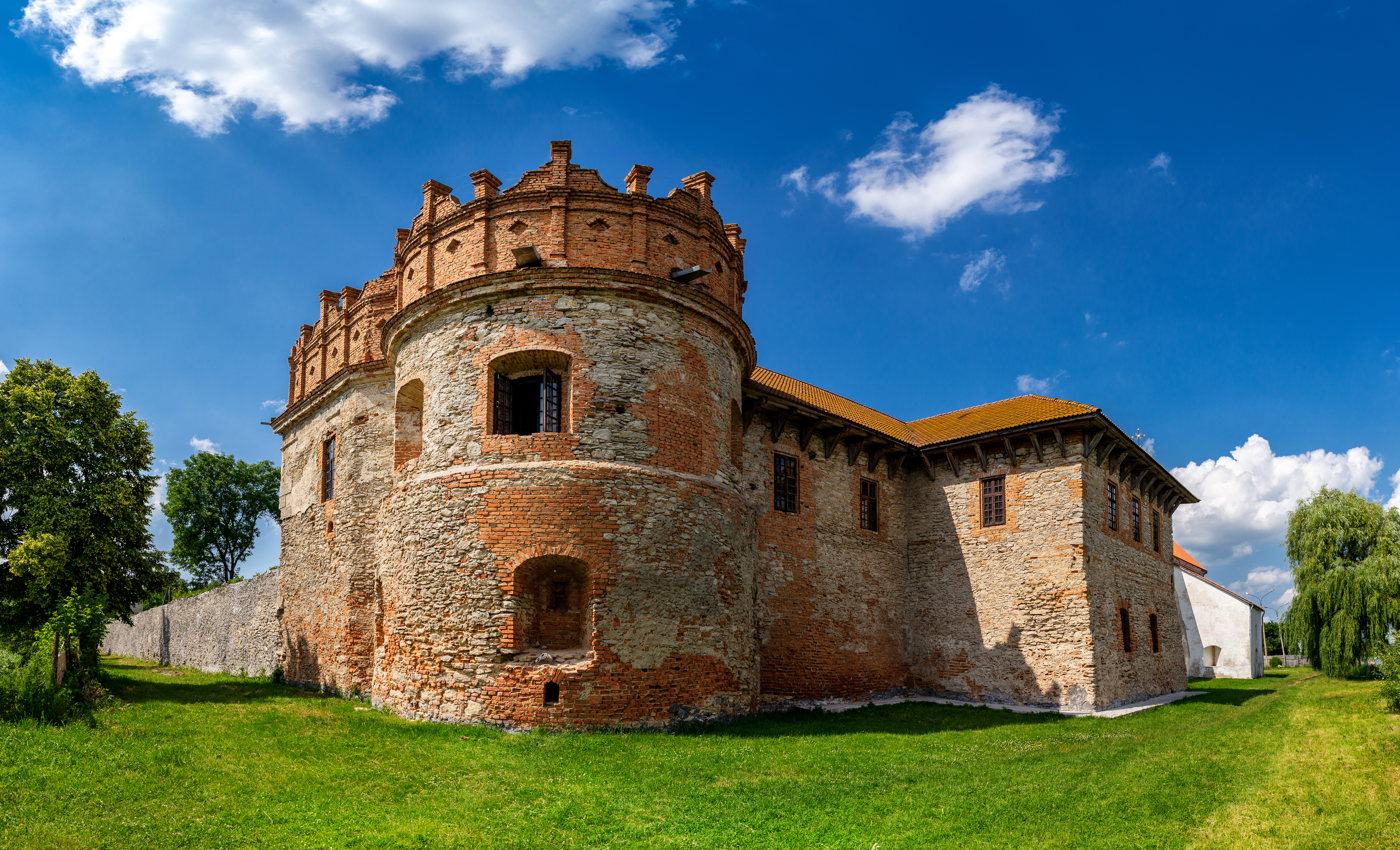
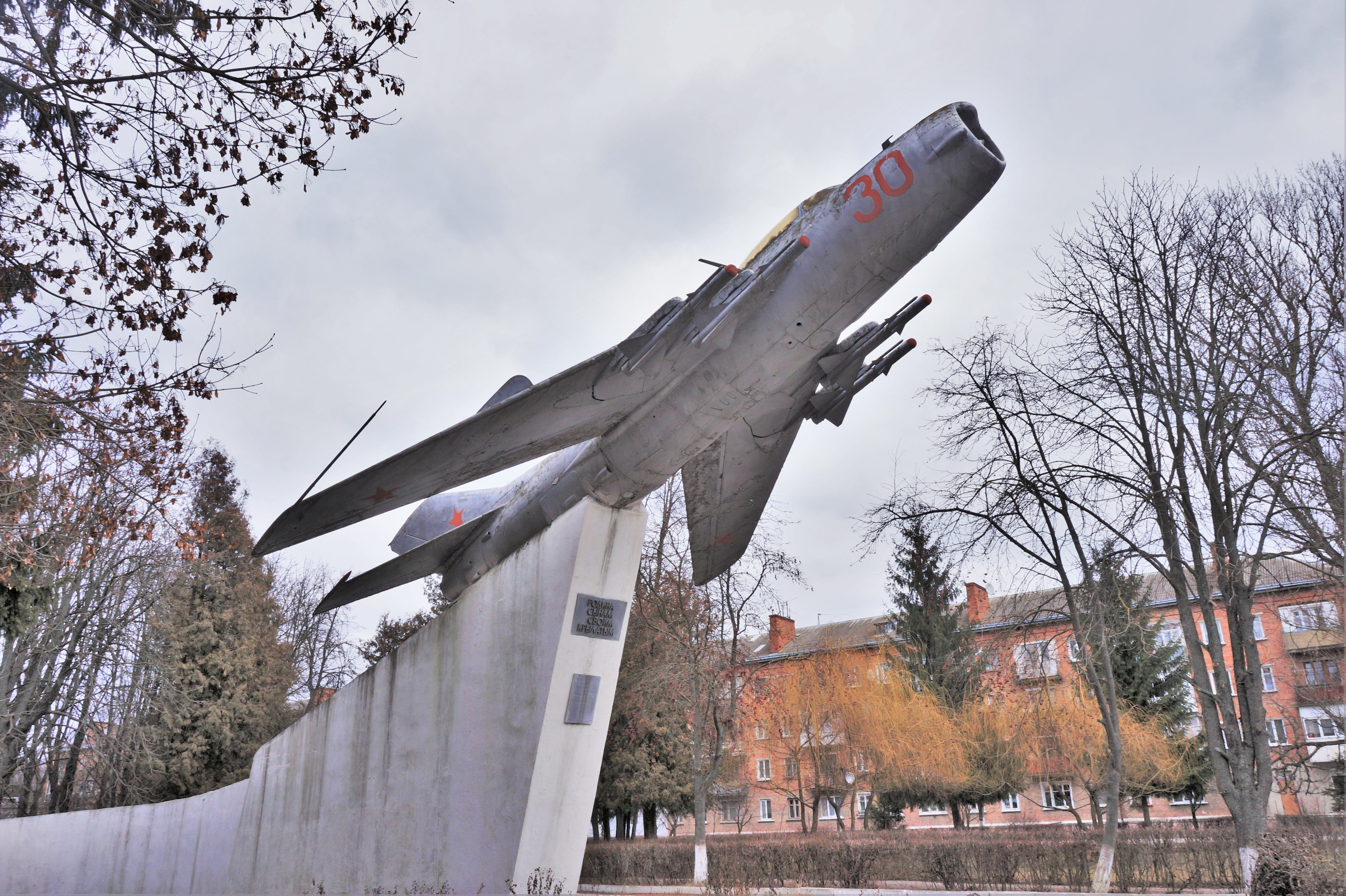
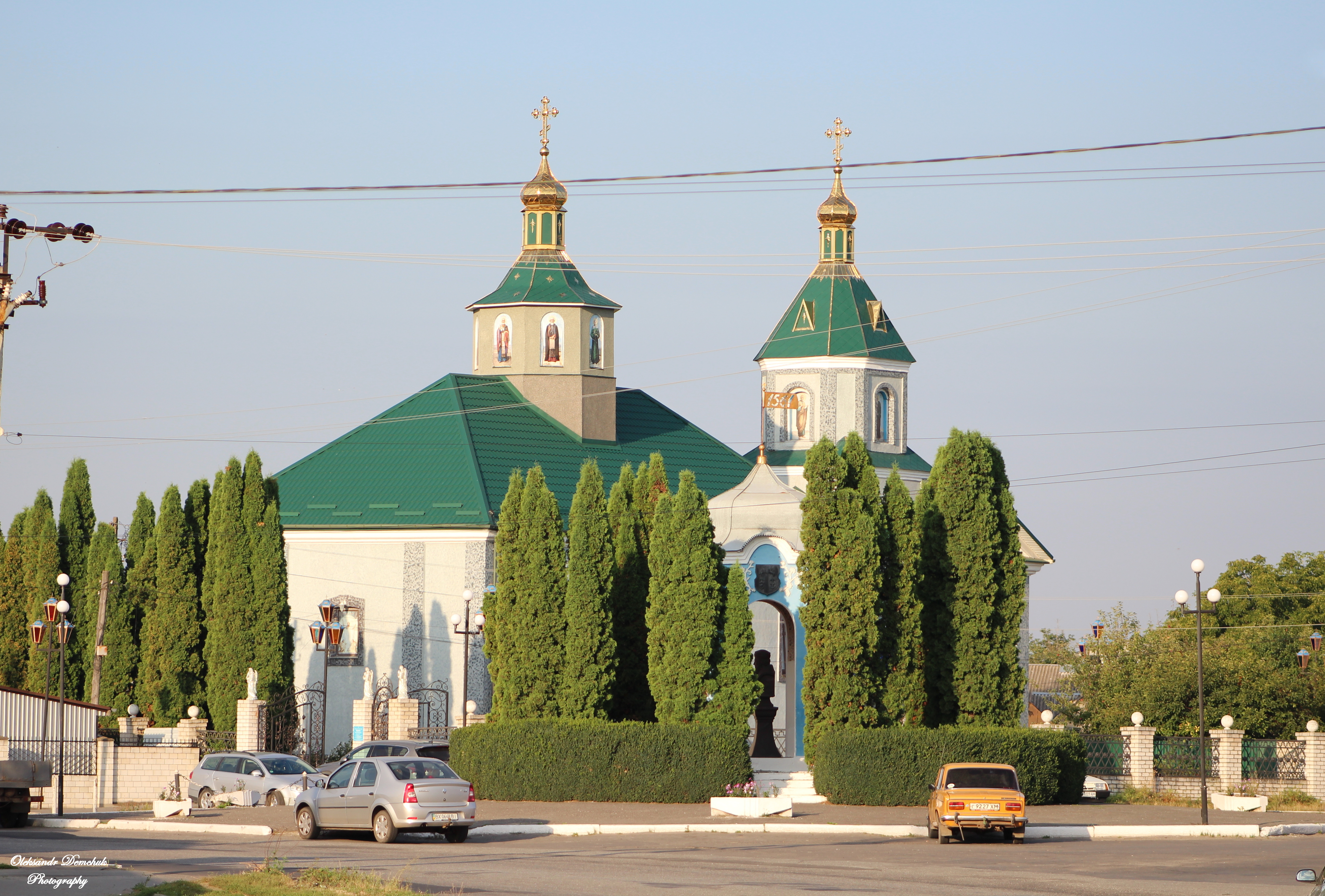
- Top: Starokostiantyniv Castle; bottom left: Monument to Pilots; bottom right: Church of the Nativity of Blessed Virgin Mary

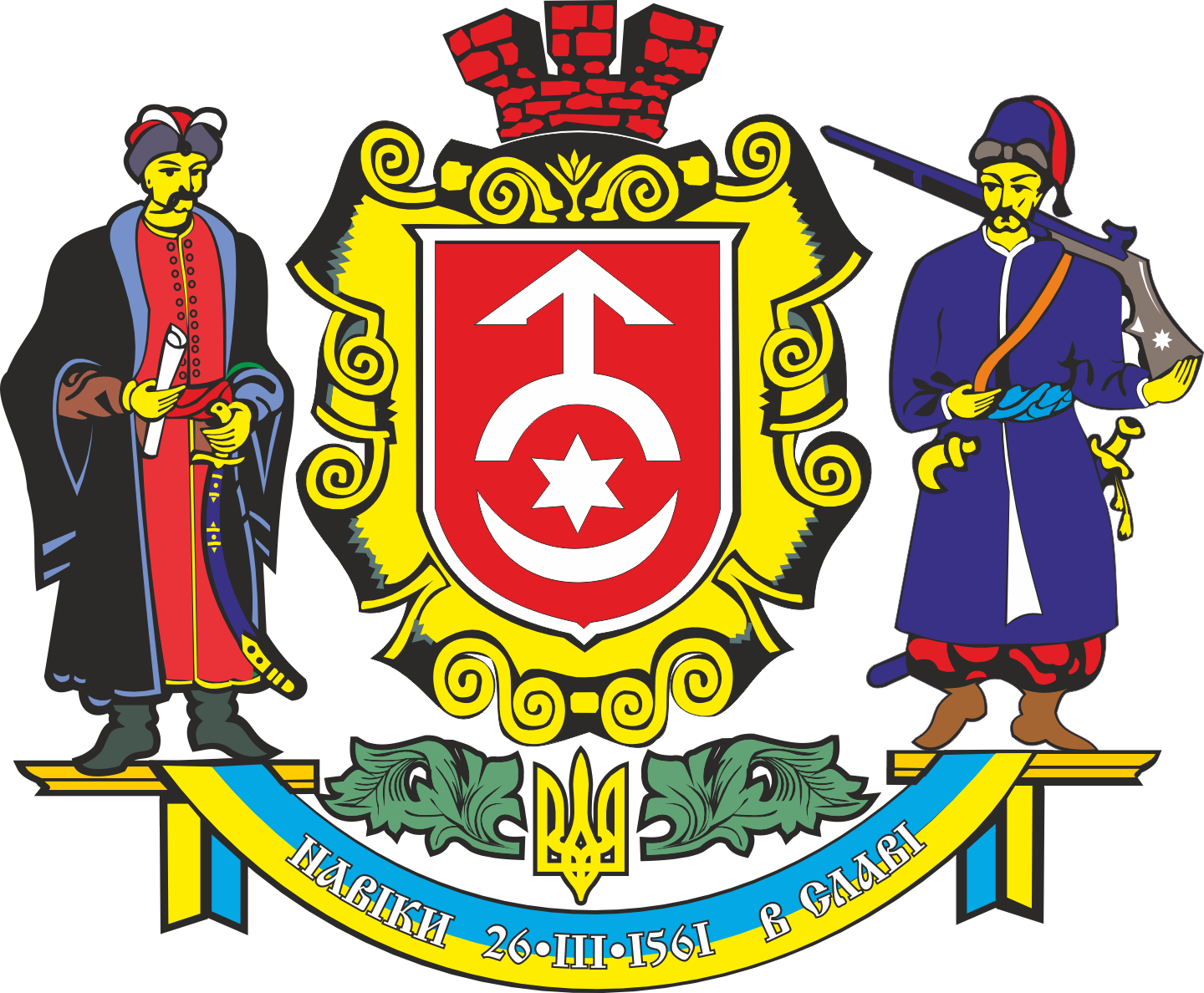
- Flag Coat of arms

- Location of Starokostiantyniv in Ukraine Starokostiantyniv (Ukraine)
- Coordinates: 49°45′14″N 27°13′13″E
- Country: Ukraine
- Oblast: Khmelnytskyi Oblast
- Raion: Khmelnytskyi Raion
- Hromada: Starokostiantyniv urban hromada
- Founded: 1561

Area
  - Total: 40 km^{2} (15 sq mi)
- Elevation: 265 m (869 ft)

Population (2022)
  - Total: 33,921
- Website: http://starkon.km.ua/

Starokostiantyniv (Ukrainian: Старокостянтинів, IPA: [ˌstɑrokosʲtʲɐnˈtɪn⁽ʲ⁾iu̯]; Polish: Starokonstantynów or Konstantynów; Yiddish: אלט-קאָנסטאַנטין, romanized: Alt Konstantin) is a city in Khmelnytskyi Raion, Khmelnytskyi Oblast (province) of western Ukraine. It hosts the administration of Starokostiantyniv urban hromada, one of the hromadas of Ukraine. Its population was 33,921 (2022 estimate). As of 2025, about 30,000 people live there.

== History ==
Historical affiliations

Grand Duchy of Lithuania 1525–1569
Polish–Lithuanian Commonwealth 1569–1793
Russian Empire 1793–1917
Ukrainian People's Republic/Ukrainian State 1917-1920
Soviet Ukraine 1920–1922
Soviet Union 1922–1991
Nazi Germany 1941–1944 (occupation)
Ukraine 1991–present

Starokostiantyniv was founded in the 16th century when Konstanty Ostrogski built a fortress at the village of Kolishchentsi. The surviving Starokostiantyniv Castle was constructed by his son between 1561 and 1571. The village grew into a town which became known as "Old Constantine's Town" (Kostiantyniv Staryi) to prevent confusion with "New Constantine's Town" in the vicinity. It became a private town of Poland, owned by the Ostrogski family. It was part of Polish Volhynian Voivodeship in the Lesser Poland Province. 1648 saw the Battle of Starokostiantyniv. The 1st Infantry Regiment of the Polish Crown Army was stationed in the town in 1791 before it was relocated to Kalisz. The town is home to an airfield.

In 1939, 6,743 Jews were living in the city, accounting for 31 percent of the total population. The Jewish community was murdered in mass executions perpetrated from August 1941 until November 1942. In the postwar period, the city grew significantly due to the development of industry (mechanical engineering and metalworking, food processing, etc.) and the deployment of a large garrison (including aviation units).

Until 18 July 2020, Starokostiantyniv was incorporated as a city of oblast significance and served as the administrative center of Starokostiantyniv Raion though it did not belong to the raion. In July 2020, as part of the administrative reform of Ukraine, which reduced the number of raions of Khmelnytskyi Oblast to three, the city of Starokostiantyniv was merged into Khmelnytskyi Raion.

On 1 October 2025, Starokostiantyniv was awarded the honorary title Hero City of Ukraine by president Volodymyr Zelenskyy due to its contributions to the country's defense and aviation. Since the beginning of the Russian invasion and until the awarding of the title, the city withstood almost 460 airstrikes.

== Demographics ==
As of the 2001 Ukrainian census, Starokostiatyniv had a population of 35,015 inhabitants, which made it the fourth-largest settlement in the Khmelnytskyi Oblast. In terms of ethnic groups in the city, Ukrainians accounted for the overwhelming majority (91.1%), significant minorities were people of Russian descent (6.7%) and Ukrainian Poles (1%). The exact ethnic composition of the city's population as of the census was as follows:

Ethnic groups in Starokostiatyniv
	percent
Ukrainians	91.14%
Russians	6.70%
Poles	0.96%
Belarusians	0.39%
Jews	0.17%
Armenians	0.12%
others	0.52%

Distribution of the population by native languages according to the 2001 census:

Native languages in Starokostiatyniv
	percent
Ukrainian	92.0%
Russian	7.5%
Belarusian	0.1%
Armenian	0.1%
Polish	0.1%
others	0.2%

== Notable people ==
- Abraham Goldfaden, poet and playwright, considered father of the modern Jewish theatre
- Ben-Zion (1897–1987), painter born in Starokostyantyniv
- Avrom Ber Gotlober (1811–1899), writer, poet, and educator of the Haskala movement.
- Jakub Weinles, Polish painter
- Anatoliy Bondarchuk, hammer thrower who won the gold medal at the 1972 Summer Olympics
- Blank family, ancestors of Vladimir Lenin
- Chana Orloff (1888–1968), art deco and figurative art sculptor

== Gallery ==
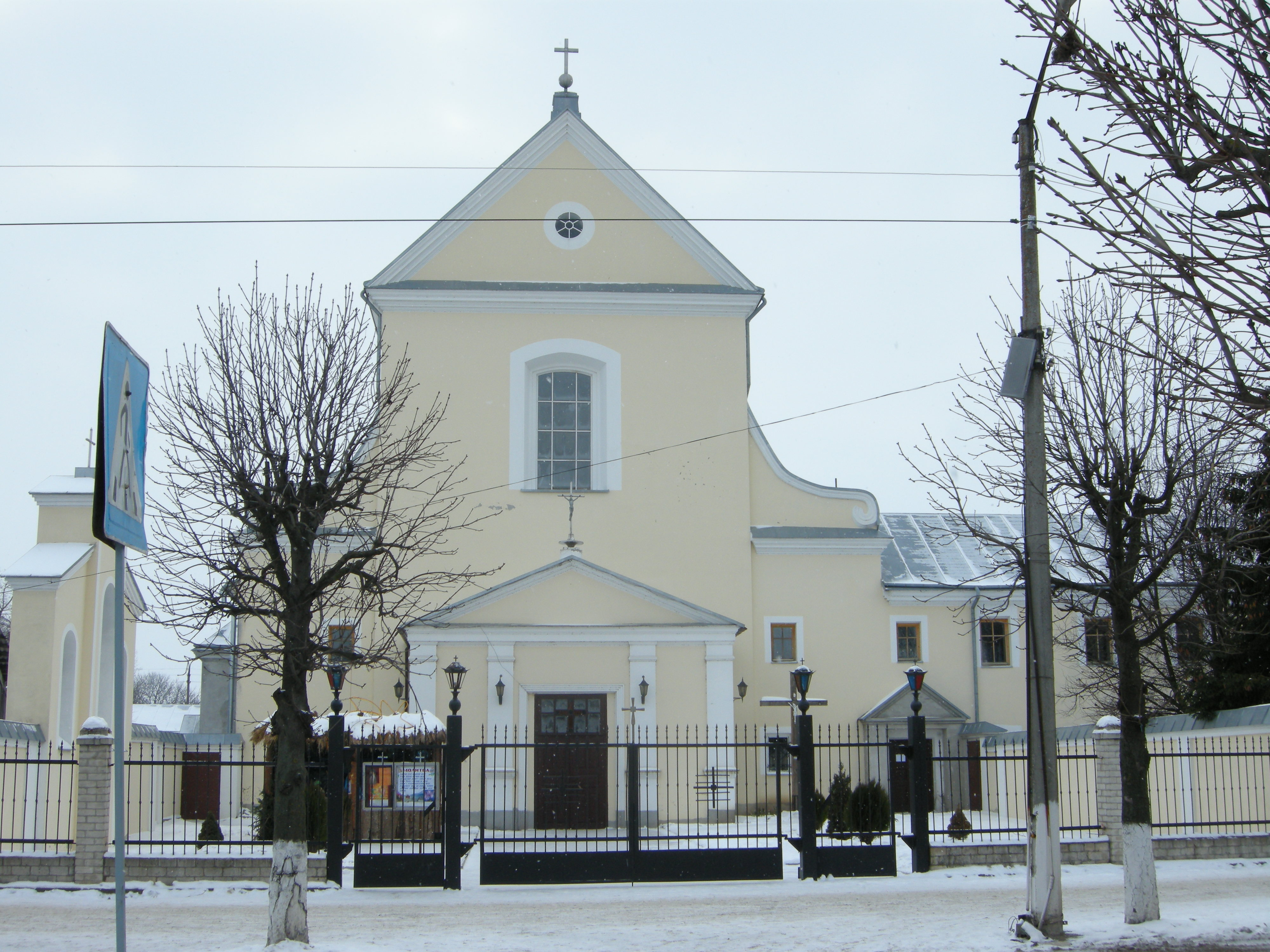
Capuchin Monastery

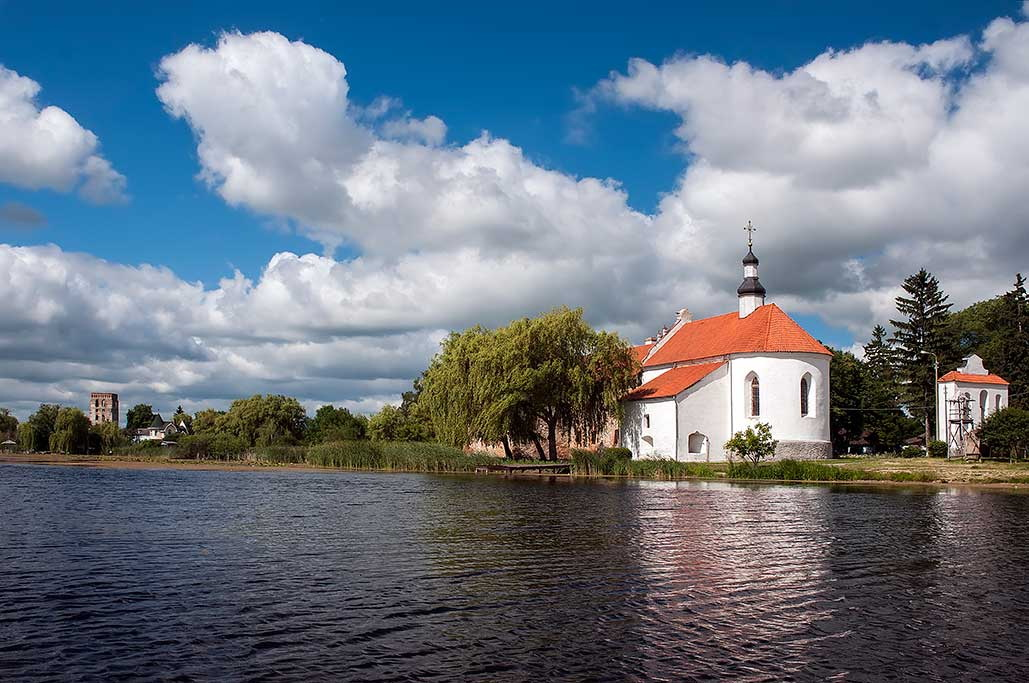
Church of Holy Trinity

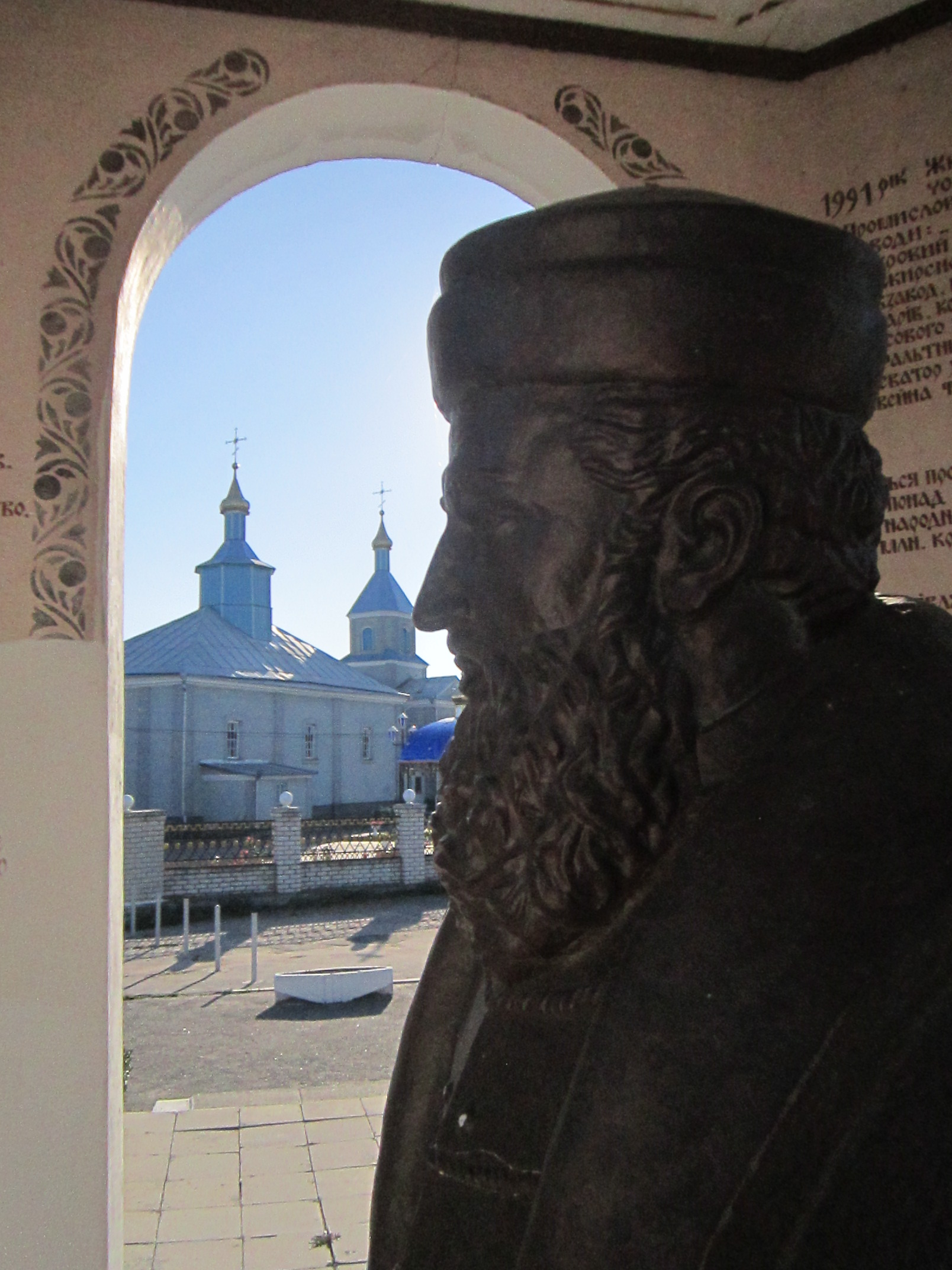
Basil Constantine Ostrozky Monument and Church of the Nativity of the Virgin Mary

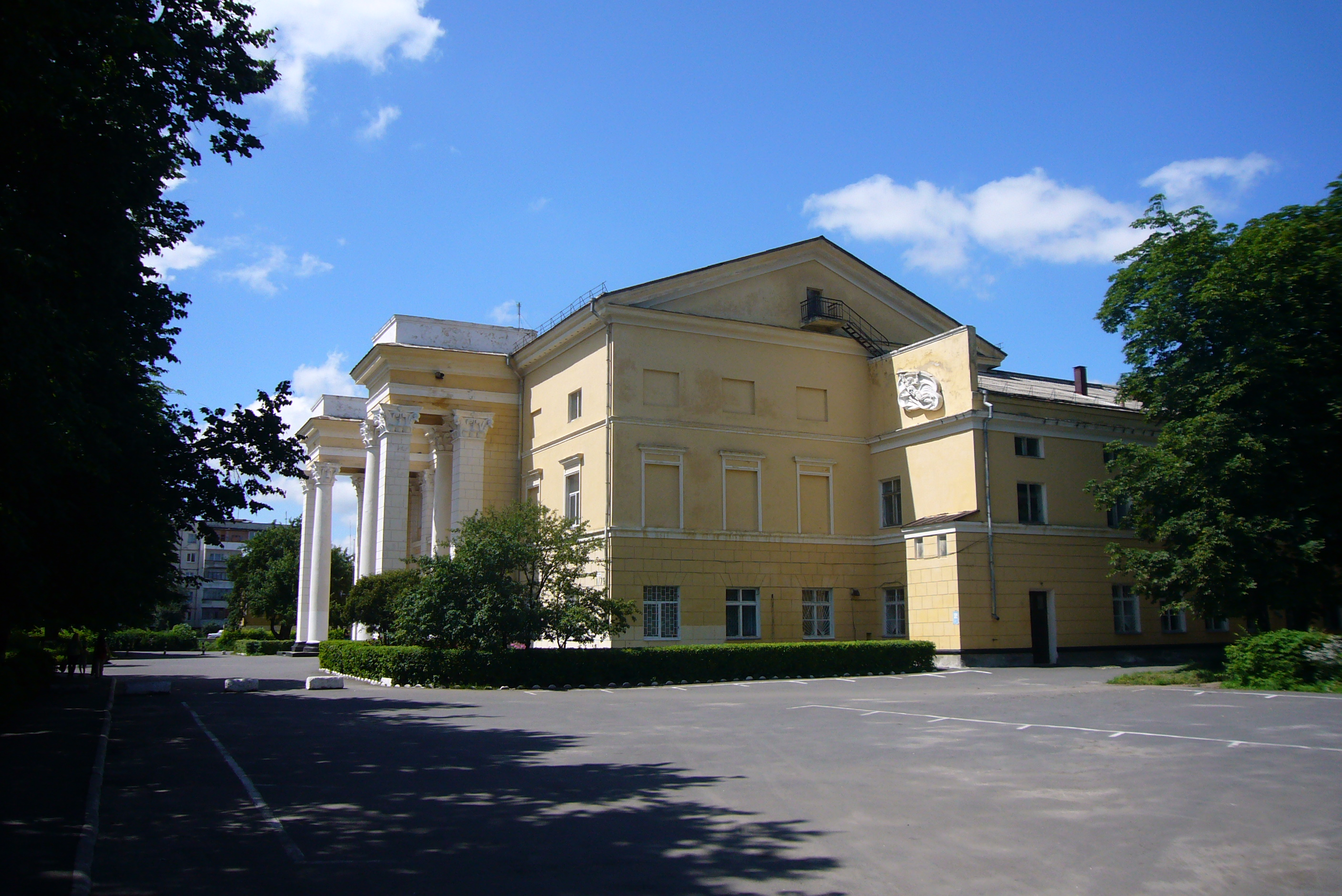
Military officers' club

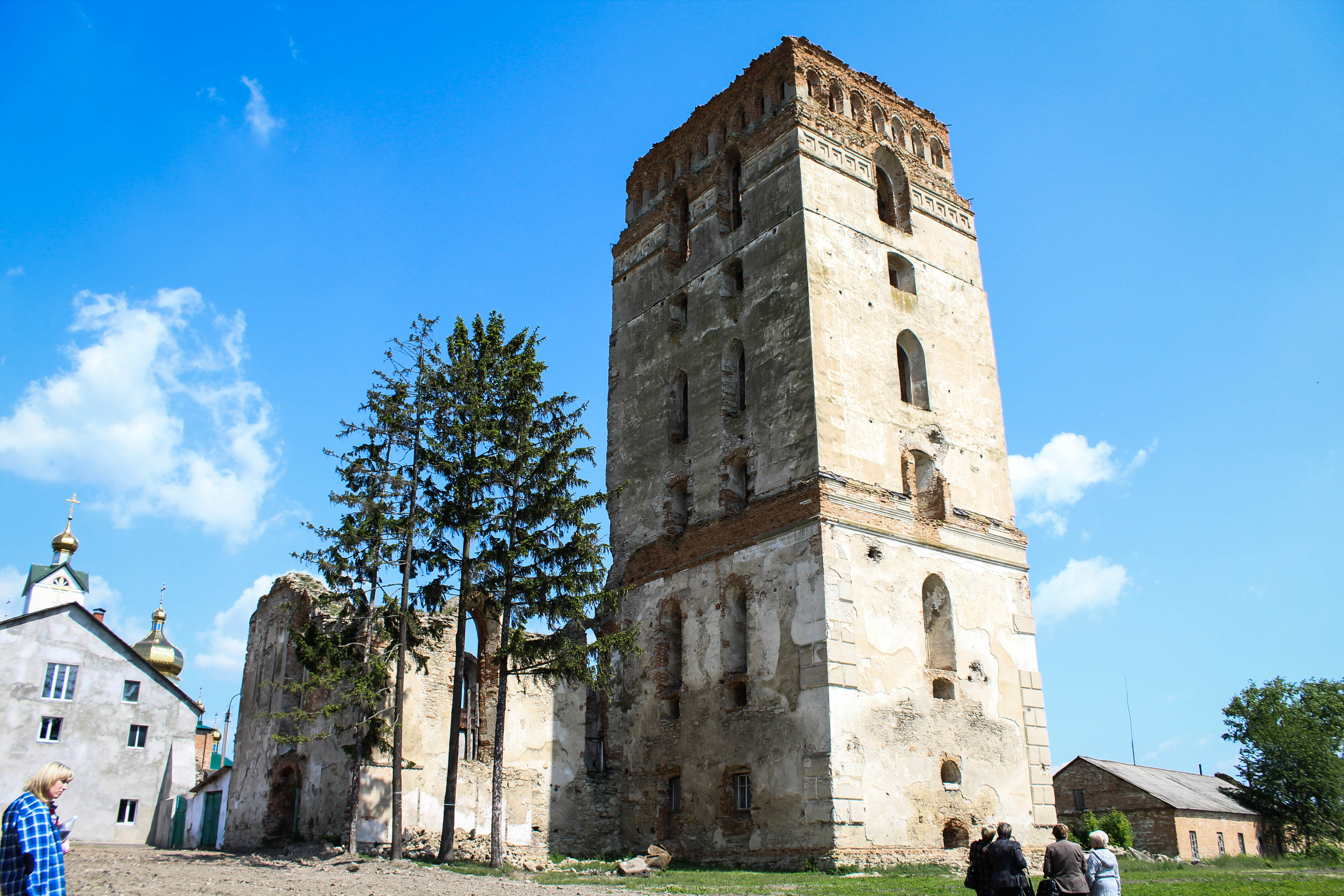
Tower of the former Dominican Monastery
