= Siege of Bar =

1648 siege

- Part of the Khmelnytsky Uprising
Date	4 August 1648
Location	Bar, Bracław Voivodeship, Polish–Lithuanian Commonwealth
Result	Cossack victory

Belligerents
Zaporozhian Cossacks	Polish–Lithuanian Commonwealth

Commanders and leaders
Maksym Kryvonis	Andrzej Potocki (surrendered)

Strength
10,000; Unspecified number of siege towers and cannons	Unspecified total number of garrison 200 dragoons c. 17 cannons

Casualties and losses
Unknown	14,000 captured
- All Polish and Jewish civilians killed or enslaved

The siege of Bar took place on 4 August 1648 between the Zaporozhian Cossacks and the Polish–Lithuanian garrison of the Bar fortress, during the Khmelnytsky Uprising. Cossack colonel Maksym Kryvonis laid siege to the fortress and captured it along with its garrison.

== Prelude ==
Bar fortress became an important defense point during the Uprising. In February 1648, Crown army initially performed well against the Cossack rebels in Podolia, with Bar serving as the main stronghold of Andrzej Potocki in this region. However, Crown army eventually begun to suffer setbacks. Bohdan Khmelnytsky sent Cossack colonel Maksym Kryvonis with the goal of capturing it. Even before the siege took place, city residents already had a visible dissatisfaction with Polish authorities of the city.

== Siege ==
Kryvonis with his 10,000 Cossacks contacted the city residents, which he planned to collaborate with in order to capture the city. Broniewski was a commander of the Bar garrison, but he deserted and Polish hetman Andrzej Potocki had to take over his place. Potocki was amused at the level of desertion among Crown army, who abandoned heavily fortified places like Bar due to the fear of Cossacks. Another reason for such high level of desertion would be the disloyalty of Ruthenian population, who were also recorded to have defected to Cossacks. Kryvonis was preparing to carry out his plan to break into the fortress. Kryvonis used cannons to shell the fortress. Cossacks built siege towers for besieging the fortress, which were described as: "float shots from demolished houses and manors, as well as vataygorods".

After damaging the fortress with cannon fire and Kryvonis successfully executing his plan, with assistance of the city residents, Cossacks managed to break into the fortress. Bar garrison suffered heavy losses and eventually surrendered to Cossacks. Cossacks captured 14,000 troops during this siege, among which were many high-ranking commanders and Polish hetmans. Andrzej Potocki himself was captured. Cossacks didn't keep their promise of mercy made during the surrender agreement, executing some Polish prisoners. Capture of the city was also accompanied by massacre and numerous atrocities on civilians.

== Aftermath ==
Cossacks captured Bar fortress. This was a major defeat for Crown army that severely undermined their morale and gave Cossacks a greater control over Podolia. This was especially visible in Kamieniec fortress, whose garrison experienced low morale. A year later, another siege of Bar fortress took place, undertaken by Piotr Potocki against Cossack garrison.
