= Janusz Tyszkiewicz Łohojski =

Polish–Lithuanian magnate and politician (1590–1649)

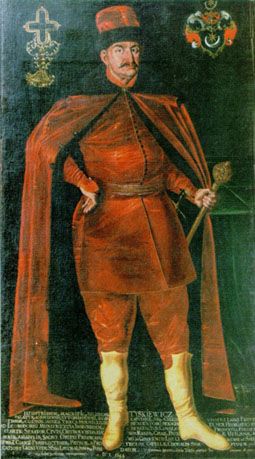

Janusz Tyszkiewicz Łohojski of Leliwa (lit. Janusz Tyszkiewicz of Łohojsk; 1590–1649) was a magnate and politician of the Polish–Lithuanian Commonwealth.

He was born 1590 to Teodor Fryderyk Tyszkiewicz and Zofia née Zasławska. He started his career as a military man, serving under Stanisław Żółkiewski in the tragic Battle of Cecora of 1620, and the subsequent victorious battle of Chocim. Throughout his political career he held a number of posts, among them that of Voivode of Kiev (since 1630), starost of Śniatyń and Żytomierz. An ardent Catholic, he spent much of his fortune supporting the foundation of numerous churches and monasteries. His best known contribution is the sponsorship of Carmelite fortified monastery in Berdychiv, started between 1626 and 1628, and completed around 1642. Married to Jadwiga Bełżecka, he had a single daughter, Krystyna Tyszkiewicz Łohojska.
