= 203rd Training Aviation Brigade =

203rd Training Aviation Brigade 203rd Aviation Training Base (1996—2004) 810th Training Aviation Regiment (1946—1995)
- 203-тя навчальна авіаційна бригада
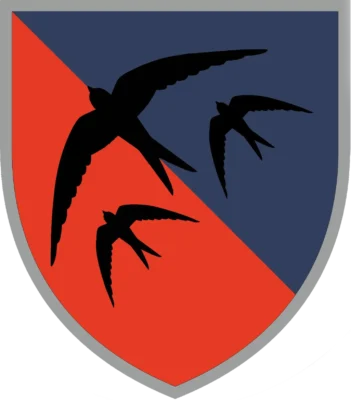
- Active: 1946 – present
- Country: Ukraine; Soviet Union (1946–1991)
- Allegiance: Armed Forces of Ukraine
- Branch: Ukrainian Air Force
- Type: Training Aviation
- Role: Pilot training
- Size: Brigade
- Part of: KNUAF
- Garrison/HQ: Chuhuiv Airbase, Kharkiv Oblast
- Nickname: Vladyslav Rykov
- Patron: Vladyslav Rykov
- Engagements: Operation Northern Falcon; Russo-Ukrainian War
- Website: Official Facebook page

Commanders
- Current commander: Lieutenant Colonel Evgeny Shukrat

Insignia
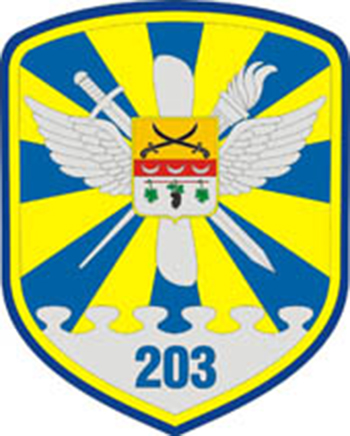
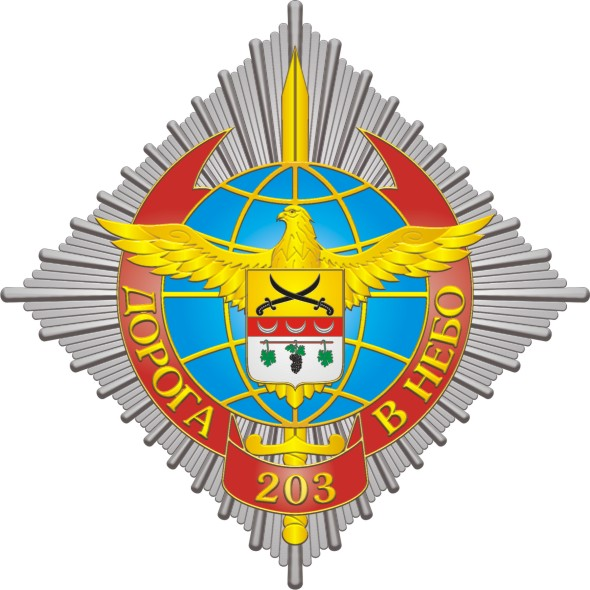
- Former Insignia

- Roundel

- Fin flash

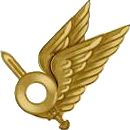
- Aviation branch insignia collar

Aircraft flown
- Fighter: Su-27
- Helicopter: Mi-8, Mi-2
- Trainer: L-39
- Transport: An-26

The 203rd Training Aviation Brigade named after Vladyslav Rykov is brigade of the Ukrainian Air Force, tasked with training of the Air Force pilots. It operates various variants of the Su-27 and Aero L-39 Albatros, An-26s, Mi-2s and Mi-8s aircraft. The brigade traces its origin to the 810th Training Aviation Regiment of the Soviet Air Force which swore allegiance to Ukraine. Since 2004, the brigade is subordinated to the Ivan Kozhedub National University of the Air Force.

== History ==
In 1992, following the, Dissolution of the Soviet Union, the 810th Training Aviation Regiment swore allegiance to Ukraine becoming a part of the Ukrainian Air Force. In December 1995, it became the 203rd Training Aviation Base including the training regiment, a communication battalion, radio technical support and an airfield technical support battalion. In August 2004 it became the 203rd Training Aviation Brigade and was subordinated to the Ivan Kozhedub National University of the Air Force in September 2004.

The brigade took part in Operation Northern Falcon to aid Denmark for cargo transport in Greenland.

In the autumn of 2013, the brigade received L-39S "Albatross" TKS-L39 for the training of pilots, in addition to the An-26, An-26Sh and Mi-8s.

In 2014, the brigade had 11 L-39M/M1/S aircraft, 2 An-26Sh, 2 Mi-8T and 1 An-26. The length of the runway used by the brigade was 2.5 km. In 2014, the brigade took part in combat operations during the War in Donbass for which two personnel of the brigade, Shkurat Yevhen Oleksandrovych and Gennady Valentinovych Dubovik were awarded the Order for Courage (III).

In the summer of 2016, the brigade received a repaired An-26.

On 1 December 2018, the brigade received two refurbished L-39S training aircraft.

On 20 March 2019, the brigade received an An-26Sh and two Mi-2MSB multipurpose helicopters. On 28 March 2019, one of the Mi-2MSBs of the brigade crashed on a routine training mission but the crash caused no casualties, the helicopter was lightly damaged but could be repaired.

On September 25, 2020, an An-26Sh aircraft crashed in what became known as the 2020 Chuhuiv An-26 crash, 26 people (7 crew members of the brigade and 19 cadets of the Ivan Kozhedub National University of the Air Force) died, only one cadet survived. The personnel of the brigade killed in the crash were Major Pocket Bohdan Vyacheslavovych, Captain Oleksiy Georgiyovych Ostapenko, Captain Dmytro Denisovych Dobrelya, Senior Lieutenant Msuya Ashraf Azizovich, Senior Lieutenant Oleg Mykhailovych Kozachenko, Flight technician Oleg Mykolayovych Shirochuk and Flight mechanic Yevgeny Ivanov Ivanov. On 22 December 2020, the brigade commander Vyacheslav Glazunov and the flight manager Oleksandr Zhuk were arrested on suspicion of violation of flight training and rules, and negligence that led to the crash.

On 6 December 2021, an Aero L-39 Albatros aircraft was transferred to the brigade.

On 1 September 2024, an Mi-2 of the brigade crashed killing two people. On 5 December 2024, the brigade was awarded the honorary title "named after Vladyslav Rykov" by decree of President Volodymyr Zelenskyy.

== Commanders ==
- Colonel Serhiy Babenko (July–December 2012)
- Colonel Gennadiy Dubovyk (December 2012-September 2014)
- Colonel Vyacheslav Glazunov (September 2014-December 2020)
- Colonel Vyacheslav Glazunov (December 2020-December 2021)
- Colonel Andriy Tvarkovskyi (December 2021-)

== Sources ==
- 203-я авіаційна навчальна бригада
- Присвячено дню авіації
- Dmytro Gorbunov, Диво-техніка для віртуальних польотів
- Вікімапія
- 203-я навчальна авіаційна бригада отримала Бойовий прапор
- Військові частини Повітряних Сил за родами військ
