= 2020 Chuhuiv An-26 crash =

Aviation accident in Ukraine

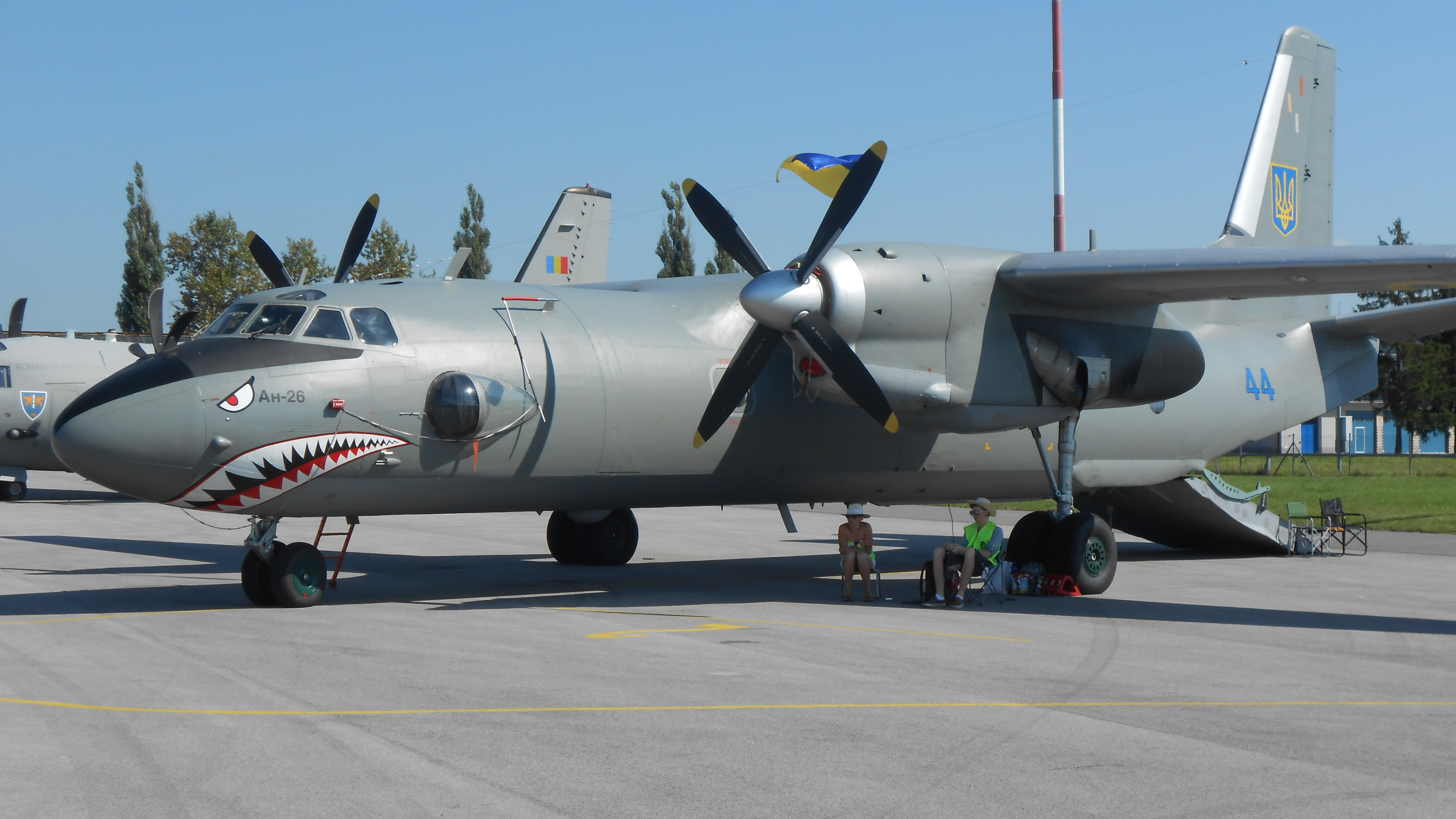
- An Antonov An-26Sh plane, similar to the one involved in the accident

Accident
- Date: 25 September 2020; 20:45 Kyiv Time
- Summary: Temperature control system malfunction that lead to pilot error
- Site: Highway M03 533–534 km (331–332 mi), near Chuhuiv Air Base, Chuhuiv, Ukraine; 49°51′36.6″N 36°38′38.7″E

Aircraft
- Aircraft type: An-26Sh
- Operator: Ukrainian Air Force
- Registration: 76 yellow
- Flight origin: Chuhuiv Air Base
- Destination: Chuhuiv Air Base
- Occupants: 27
- Passengers: 20
- Crew: 7
- Fatalities: 26
- Injuries: 1
- Survivors: 1

On 25 September 2020, an An-26Sh military transport plane crashed during a training flight in Chuhuiv, Kharkiv Oblast, Ukraine. Of the 27 people on board, one survived. The aircraft was destroyed. The aircraft had tail number 76 and belonged to the 203rd Training Aviation Brigade (A4104 military unit).

According to an official government investigation both pilot errors and technical malfunctions of the aircraft caused the crash.

== History of the flight ==
From 18:50 25 September 2020, there were flights on the An-26Sh training of flying and navigating cadets of the Ivan Kozhedub National Air Force University to gain skills in flying and piloting aircraft. The flights went according to plan and were to last until 10:50 pm. In the time before the crash, the plane had made six successful take-offs and five successful landings.

The crew consisted of 7 people. The crew was commanded by Bohdan Kyshenia, an instructor pilot, a second-class pilot who had flown more than 700 hours. The cadets took turns sitting in the right chair to gain piloting skills.

According to official data, the following course of events was previously established:

- At 20:35 the plane took off from Chuhuiv Air Base and started flying according to the program.
- At 20:38 the crew noticed a pressure drop in the left engine torque sensor, which was reported to the air traffic controller, after which it was instructed to land.
- At 20:40 the crew made a request to land, but because another plane was boarding at that time, the crew received permission to land a minute after the request.
- At 20:43 the aircraft passed the aerodrome's long-range radio beacon, prepared flaps and landing gear, began descent, and reported readiness for landing.
- At 20:45 during the approach the plane lost altitude and collided with the ground at a distance of about 1,500 metres (4,900 ft; 1,600 yd) from the air base runway. After that, the plane fuselage caught fire.

The plane crashed near the M03 Kyiv-Kharkiv-Dovzhansky highway. The fire, which broke out after the plane crash, was extinguished at 9:55 pm by the State Emergency Service brigades and other the Ministry of Internal Affairs units that arrived on the site. During the crash, the plane nearly hit one of the cars traveling on the highway. Drivers and passengers called rescuers to the crash site and provided first aid to the people who survived the crash: one of them was on fire and extinguished with a fire extinguisher, and the other had a broken head and a cut on his leg, but he was conscious and could speak. Eyewitnesses also reported that the cadets jumped without parachutes.

There were 27 people on board – 20 cadets of the Ivan Kozhedub National Air Force University and seven officers. One cadet wasn't allowed to board the flight at the last moment. Twenty-five bodies were found at the crash site. Two cadets survived the accident, but one of them, having received burns to 90% of his body, died on 26 September in an ambulance hospital in Kharkiv. A total of 26 people died in the plane crash – 19 cadets and seven crew members. The bodies of the dead were badly burned and mutilated, and a DNA examination was required to identify them, which took 2–3 weeks.

One cadet survived and is in the Military Medical Clinical Center of the Northern Region "with numerous bruises and concussions.". It was later reported that his condition was stable, he had injured his leg and received multiple bruises, but he will soon be discharged from the hospital. He later said that everything happened quickly, "like in a computer game," and after he woke up, he helped put out the person who was on fire.

Throughout the 25 September evening, the Ministry of Internal Affairs, the Ministry of Defense, and the Kharkiv Oblast State Administration called different numbers of people on board the plane at the crash time.

The plane wreckage is located at 533–534 kilometres (331–332 mi) mark of the M03 Kyiv-Kharkiv-Dovzhansky highway, which complicates the vehicles movement that passes through one free lane.

There are no certainties yet as to what caused the plane crash. The Geneva-based Bureau of Aircraft Accidents Archives suggested that since 2017, at least 10 Antonov An-26 aircraft are said to have crashed.

According to the Minister of Defense of Ukraine Andriy Taran, the plane was in good condition, had enough flight resources, but for unknown reasons caught the wing on the ground. According to preliminary estimates, the failure of one of the engine sensors had been considered, but the engine itself did not appear to have failed. At the same time, the mother of the pilot, Ashraf Msuia, told journalists that her son mentioned that the aircraft itself was not in good shape at all, and that the aircraft's engines were constantly failing.

== Aircraft ==
The An-26Sh (tail number 76, serial number 56-08, issued on 21 October 1977) had a total flight time of 5985 hours and made 3450 landings. In July 1996, it was renovated at the Aircraft Repair Plant 410 (Kyiv).

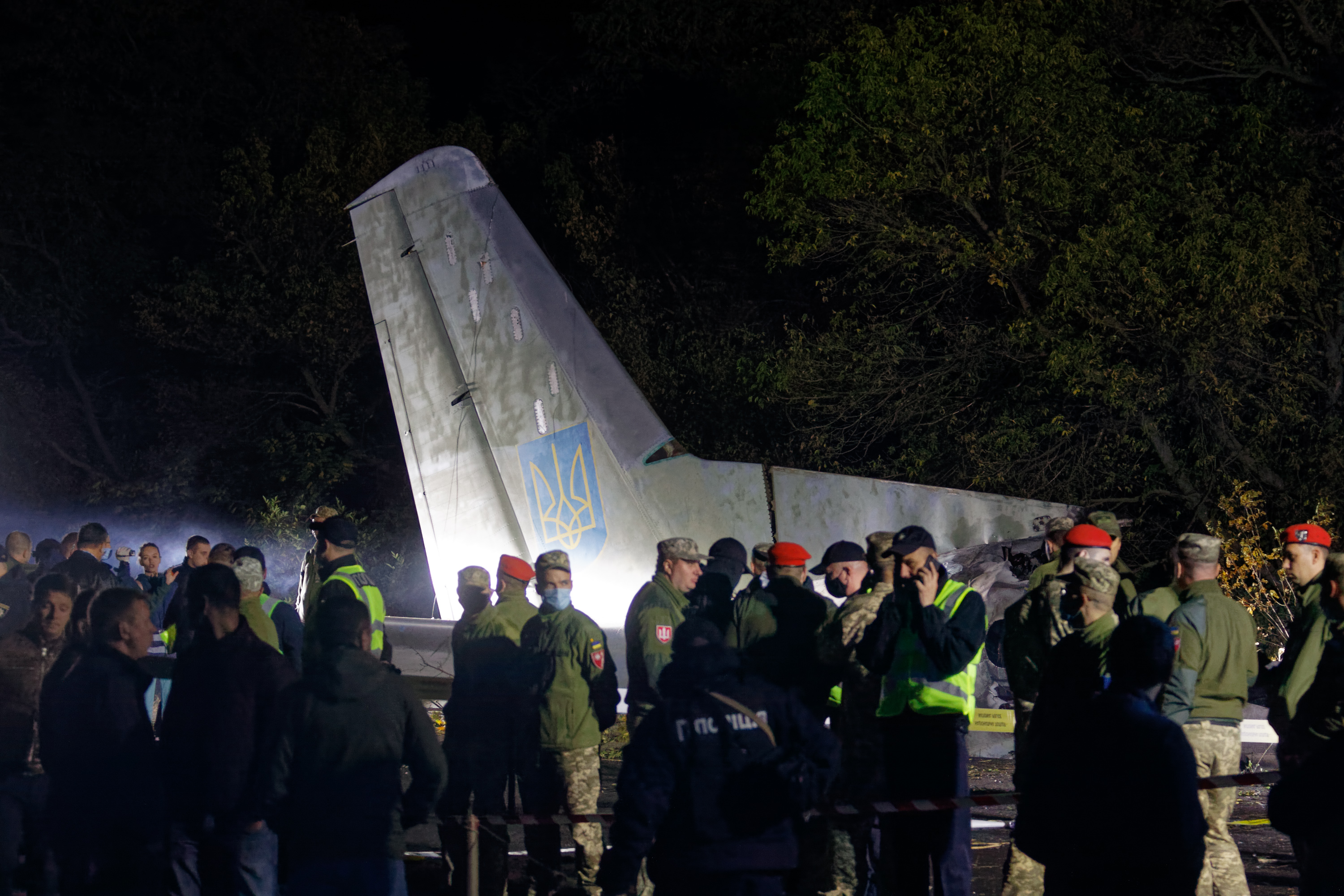
Tail.

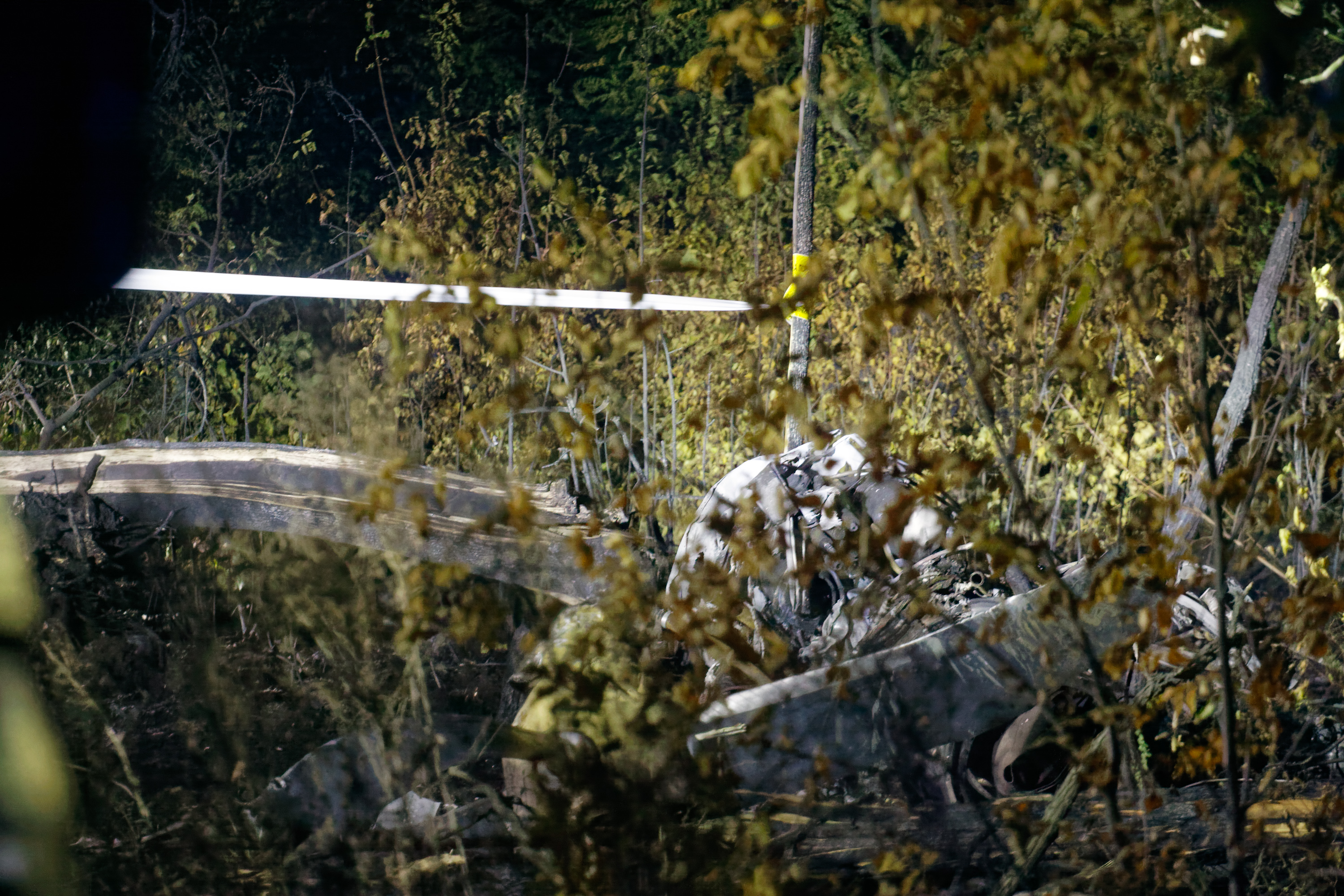
Wreckage behind the trees

Since the repair time, it has flown 1,800 hours and made 2,160 landings. For aircraft of this type, the service life limit is set at 20,000 flight hours and 14,000 landings. In August 2020, under the Antonov specialists' supervision, the service life was extended until 21 June 2022, and the next overhaul was to take place in July 2022. AI-24VT engines were installed on the plane. The service life of the right engine (released in the fourth quarter of 1974) before the next repair was until 11 October 2020, and the left (released in December 1977) – until 5 June 2021.

The plane was ready for flight and no major repairs were planned for 2020. The information on the Prozorro public procurement website, which was published in July 2020, on the conclusion of the contract for the aircraft repair, one of which was the An-26Sh with tail number 76, related to the work performed by Antonov in full and Antonov extended the aircraft service life by two years.

== Victims ==
On 26 September 2020, Ivan Kozhedub National Air Force University published on its Facebook page the names of officers and cadets who died in the plane crash. Two people survived the crash, one of them died later in a hospital.

A farewell ceremony for 20-year-old cadet Vitaliy Vilkhovy, who died at the hospital from severe injuries in a plane crash, took place on 29 September at the Memorial of Glory in Kharkiv.

== Reactions ==
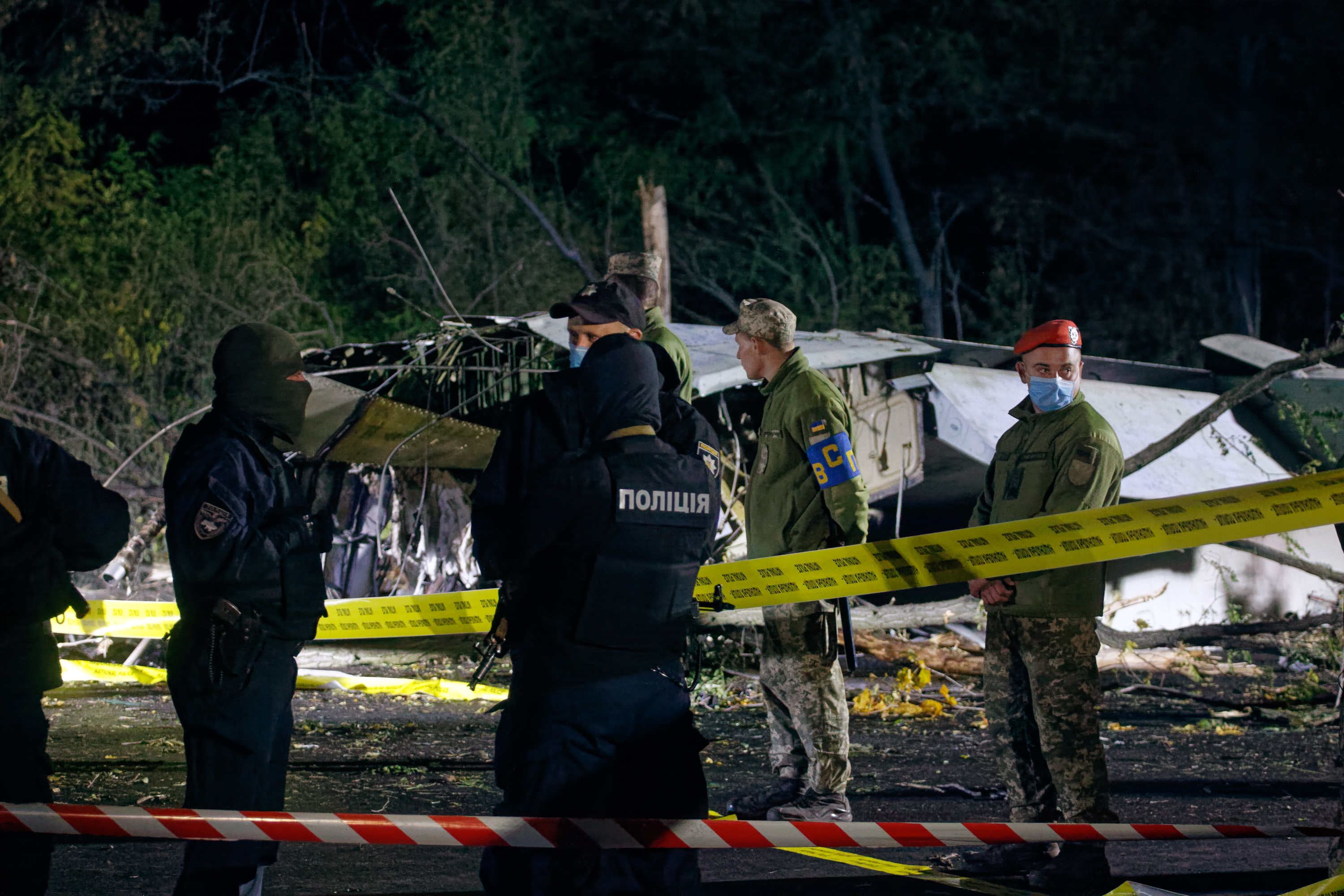
Wreckage of the An-26

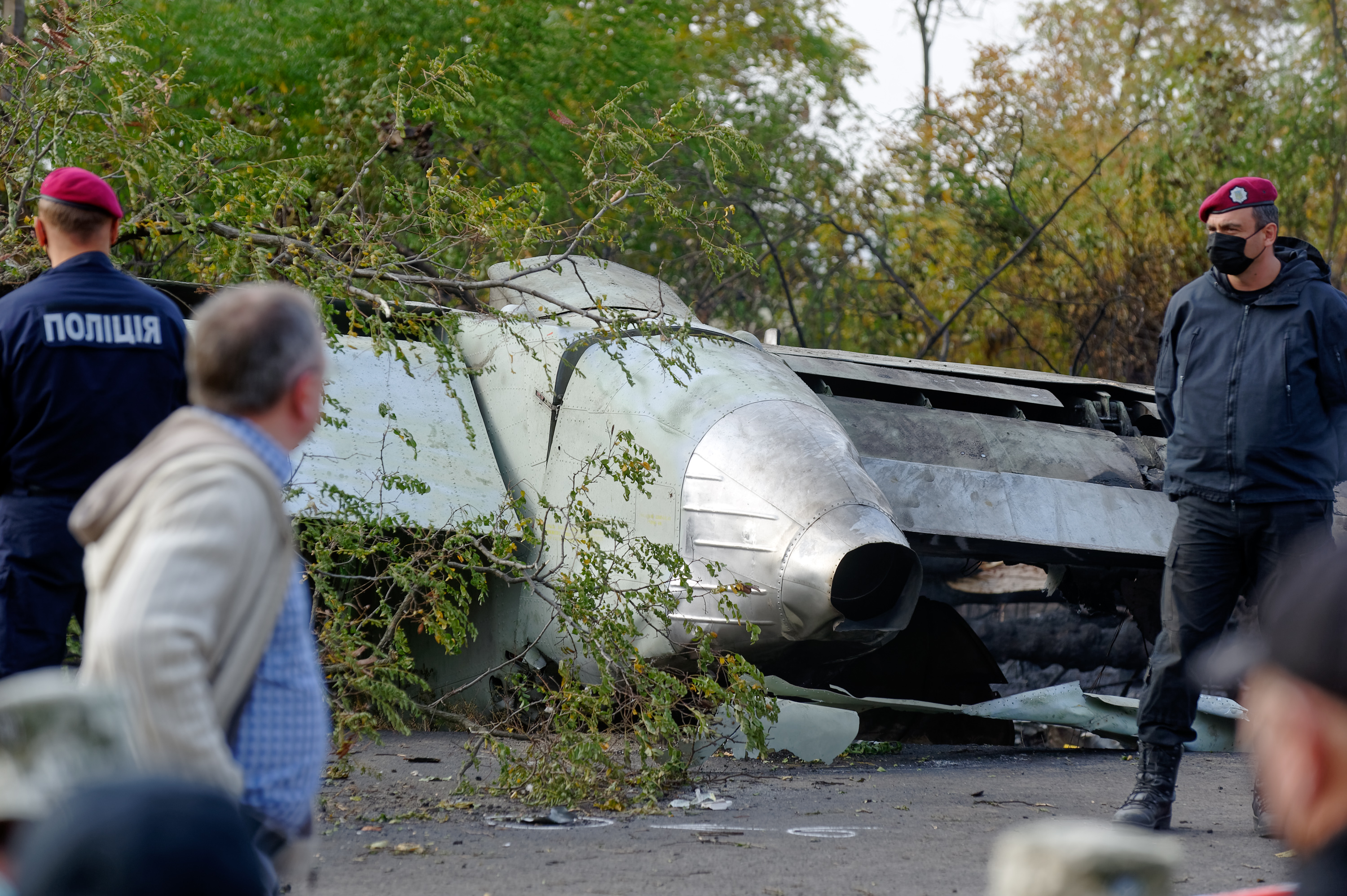
Part of the empennage of the accident plane

On 26 September, Ukrainian president Volodymyr Zelenskyy created a commission for investigation of the circumstances of the tragedy and providing all necessary assistance. The State Commission for Investigation of the Circumstances of the Tragedy and Providing All Necessary Assistance to the Victims included: Commander-in-Chief of the Armed Forces of Ukraine Colonel-General Ruslan Khomchak, Head of the Security Service of Ukraine Ivan Bakanov, First Deputy NSDC Secretary Mykhailo Koval, Minister of Internal Affairs of Ukraine Arsen Avakov, Minister of Health Maksym Stepanov, Deputy Head of Office of the President of Ukraine Oleh Tatarov, Head of State Aviation Administration of Ukraine Oleksandr Bilchuk, Chairman of State Emergency Service of Ukraine Mykola Chechotkin, Kharkiv Oblast State Administration Head Oleksiy Kucher and other officials. The State Commission is headed by Deputy Prime Minister Oleh Urusky, Minister of Defense, and deputy head, Andriy Taran.

A a day of mourning was declared in Ukraine for 26 September. In Kharkiv, citizens carried flowers and lanterns to the Ivan Kozhedub National Air Force University's main building. On the same day, Zelenskyy instructed to suspend the flights of all An-26s and their analogues until the crash causes were clarified and to provide information on the technical condition of military equipment. According to the Deputy Office of the President Oleh Tatarov, also on behalf of Zelenskyy, the Ministry of Internal Affairs must review defense contracts and strengthen control over the criminal investigation in the defense field for the purchase and maintenance of military equipment.

The Minister of Defense Andriy Taran has decided to pay one-time financial assistance in the amount of 1,576,000 UAH ($56,285) to the families of the victims of the plane crash, which will be funded by the Ministry of Defense of Ukraine. Condolences were expressed by the Orthodox Church of Ukraine head Metropolitan Epiphanius of Kyiv.

=== Abroad ===
Condolences on the tragedy were expressed by the Canadian Prime Minister Justin Trudeau, the EU Vice President and the EU High Representative for Foreign Affairs Josep Borrell, Azerbaijani President Ilham Aliyev, Lithuanian Foreign Minister Linas Linkevičius, Latvian Foreign Minister Edgars Rinkēvičs, Estonian Foreign Minister Urmas Reinsalu, Azerbaijani Foreign Minister Jeyhun Bayramov, Polish Foreign Minister Zbigniew Rau, European Council President Charles Michel as did diplomatic missions of the US, NATO, Norway, Montenegro, Croatia, Austria, Afghanistan, Denmark, Italy, France, Great Britain, Canada, Germany, Spain, Switzerland, Slovenia, Moldova, Georgia, Romania, Turkey, Sweden, Bulgaria and Albania.

Russian Orthodox Church head Patriarch Kirill expressed condolences.

== Investigation ==
The State Bureau of Investigation (DBR) and the Office of the Prosecutor General launched a pre-trial investigation into the military aircraft crash for violating flight rules and preparing for them, which caused a catastrophe and severe consequences (Article 416 of the Criminal Code of Ukraine).

The State Bureau of Investigation considered such probable causes of the crash: a technical malfunction, a pilot error, errors in flight control, and improper maintenance.

At the accident scene, DBR began investigative actions with the involvement of relevant specialists – a total of 50 investigators worked. More than 50 examinations were ordered. Surviving flight recorders were found and sent for deciphering. The planes' large wreckage was transported from the crash site to a special site on the territory of the 203rd Aviation Training Brigade for examination by specialists.

At the time of the investigation, those responsible for organizing and conducting training flights were removed.

State Bureau of Investigation Main Investigation Department head Maksym Borchakovsky stated that the information about the plane's left engine failure is unreliable.

On 28 October the government commission announced the following causes of the accident:

- lack of control over the organization of flights by officials of the Kharkiv University of the Air Force
- systematic violations of flight rules at the university
- insufficient preparation of the crew for special situations
- conveyor-style takeoffs (the sixth flight in a row was performed at time of accident)
- engine control system failure
- violation of the flight schedule.

On 18 December 2020 the DBR announced the suspicion of the Commander of the Air Force of the Armed Forces of Ukraine Serhii Drozdov of negligent attitude to official duties, which caused severe consequences. Investigators suspect that a person without proper experience was allowed to fly the aircraft.

On 22 December 2020 the Pechersk Raion Court of Kyiv took into custody the commander of the A-4104 military unit Viacheslav Hlazunov on suspicion of negligence and violation of training and flight rules and flight manager Oleksander Zhuk on suspicion of violating the preparation and rules of flight, negligence (respectively), which led to the crash of the An-26 and the death of 26 servicemen.

On 22 December 2020 the Pechersk Raion Court of Kyiv released the Commander of the Air Force of Ukraine Serhii Drozdov on personal duty, imposing on him the duties of not leaving the city, notifying of a change of residence, and arriving at the request of the court, prosecutor's office or investigator.

On 30 April 2021 DBR investigators, in agreement with the Prosecutors of the Specialized Prosecutor's Office in the Military and Defense Forces of the Joint Forces, reported the suspicion of new persons involved in the tragic event of the An-26 plane crash, namely: deputy commander of the A4104 military unit, where the disaster occurred; deputy commander of the A4104 military unit for flight training, who are suspected of violating the rules of preparation and conduct of flights and negligent attitude to military service (Article 416 and Paragraph 3 of Article 425 of the Criminal Code of Ukraine). In addition, prosecutors reported suspicion of negligence in military service by an oblast council deputy who was acting head of the Kharkiv National Air Force University at the time of the crash.

On 3 May 2021 according to the press service of the State Bureau of Investigation, the Pechersk Raion Court of Kyiv chose precautionary measures in the form of night house arrest for 60 days for the former chief of KNAFU, deputy commander of A4104 military unit, where the crash occurred and deputy commander of the military unit for flight training.

== See also ==
- List of sole survivors of aviation accidents or incidents
