= Oleksandr Kukurba =

Ukrainian military officer (1994–2022)

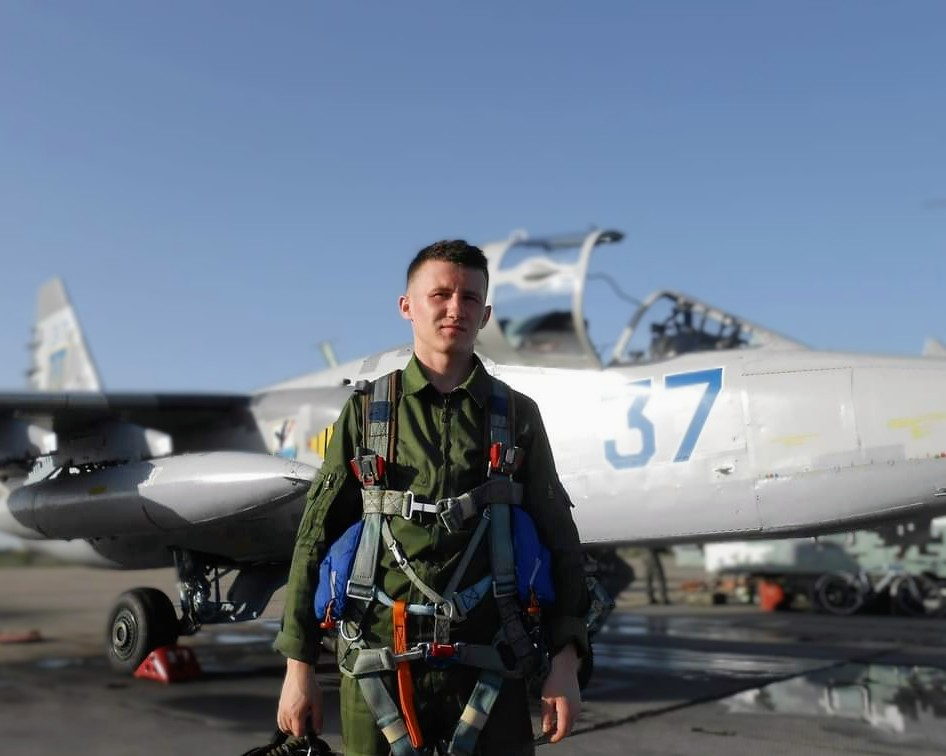
- Native name: Олександр Кукурба
- Born: September 18, 1994; Verkhnii Verbizh, Ukraine
- Died: July 26, 2022 (aged 27) Dnipropetrovsk Oblast, Ukraine
- Allegiance: Ukraine
- Branch: Ukrainian Air Force; 299th Tactical Aviation Brigade
- Conflicts: Russo-Ukrainian War; War in Donbas; Russian invasion of Ukraine
- Awards: Hero of Ukraine; Order of Bohdan Khmelnytsky 1st class (posthumously); Order of Bohdan Khmelnytsky 2nd class Order of Bohdan Khmelnytsky 3rd class
- Alma mater: Ivan Kozhedub National Air Force University

Oleksandr Vasyliovich Kukurba (Ukrainian: Олександр Васильович Кукурба; 18 September 1994 – 26 July 2022) was a Ukrainian Air Force major. A recipient of the Hero of Ukraine and Order of Bohdan Khmelnytsky awards, Kukurba served as a member of the Ukrainian Air Force during the Russian invasion of Ukraine, when he died in battle.

== Biography ==
Oleksandr Kukurba was born in 1994 in the village of Verkhnii Verbizh in Ukraine's western Ivano-Frankivsk Oblast. He studied at the Nizhniy Verbizh comprehensive school, and completed his military service as the head of intelligence at the headquarters of the 299th tactical aviation brigade of the Armed Forces of Ukraine.

During the repulse of the Russian invasion of Ukraine, Kukurba flew 100 sorties, destroyed more than 20 tanks and about 50 combat units of armored vehicles and other means, as well as more than 300 enemy personnel.

Kukurba died in battle on 26 July 2022. The Nizhniy Verbizh community declared 27–29 July to be days of mourning. Kukurba was buried in his native village on 29 July 2022. Two days of mourning for him where held in his place of birth.

== Awards and honours ==
- the title Hero of Ukraine with the awarding of the «Golden Star» order (14 April 2022) — for personal courage and heroism, shown in the defense of state sovereignty and territorial integrity of Ukraine.
- Order of Bohdan Khmelnytskyi I class (8 August 2022, posthumously).
- Order of Bohdan Khmelnytskyi II class (6 July 2022) — for personal courage and selfless actions shown in the defense of state sovereignty and territorial integrity of Ukraine, loyalty to the military oath.
- Order of Bohdan Khmelnytskyi III class (22 March 2022) — for personal courage and selfless actions shown in the defense of the state sovereignty and territorial integrity of Ukraine, loyalty to the military oath.

In November 2022 the Cosmonaut Komarov street in Dnipro (located in the Sobornyi District) was renamed Oleksandr Kukurba Street as part of the Derussification drive following the Russian invasion.
