= Denys Vasyliuk =

Ukrainian fighter pilot

- Денис Василюк
- Born: Vasyliuk Denys Oleksandrovych; 17 January 1993; Dzhankoi, Crimea, Ukraine
- Died: 17 May 2024 (aged 31); Metalivka, Kharkiv Oblast, Ukraine
- Education: Kharkiv Higher Military Aviation School of Pilots
- Military career
- Allegiance: Ukraine
- Branch: Ukrainian Air Force
- Rank: Lieutenant colonel (Pidpolkovnyk)
- Nickname: Flash
- Unit: 831st Tactical Aviation Brigade
- Conflicts: Russo-Ukrainian War; Annexation of Crimea; 2022 Russian invasion of Ukraine
- Awards: Order for Courage, 1st class Order for Courage, 2nd class Order for Courage, 3rd class Medal For Military Service to Ukraine Order of the Gold Star (posthumously)

Denys Oleksandrovych Vasyliuk (Ukrainian: Денис Олександрович Василюк; 17 January 1993 – 17 May 2024), nicknamed the Flash, was a Ukrainian fighter pilot. He was a lieutenant colonel in the Ukrainian Air Force. He was posthumously awarded the Order of Gold Star.

== Career ==
Denys Vasyliuk was Lieutenant Colonel, First Deputy Commander of the Aviation Squadron. Denys was a fighter pilot of the Air Force of the Armed Forces of Ukraine, a true professional in his field. Between March 2022 and May 2024, he carried out 94 sorties: he destroyed UAVs and cruise missiles, weapons, aircraft and military equipment of the Russian occupiers on the ground, in particular, he launched air strikes on targets on Zmiinyi Island. On May 17, 2024, when Lieutenant Colonel Denys Vasyliuk was attacking the enemy in the Kharkiv direction, an enemy missile hit his Su-27P. At the cost of his own life, he destroyed all the assigned targets and saved his brothers-in-arms at the forefront of defense.

== Personal life ==
Denys Vasyliuk had a wife by the name of Vladyslava Vasyliuk.

== Awards ==
- Order For Courage. First Class (4 December 2023)
- Order For Courage. Second Class (13 April 2023)
- Order For Courage. Third Class (12 July 2022)
- Medal For Military Service to Ukraine (17 June 2022)
- Order of the Gold Star (4 August 2024)

== See also ==
- Ghost of Kyiv
- List of aircraft losses during the Russo-Ukrainian War
- Oleksandr Oksanchenko (Grey Wolf)
- Dmytro Fischer
- Denys Kyryliuk
- Andrii Pilshchykov (Juice)
- Vladyslav Savieliev (Nomad)
- Vadym Voroshylov (Karaya)
