= Rostyslav Lazarenko =

Ukrainian military pilot (born 1994)

- Ростислав Лазаренко
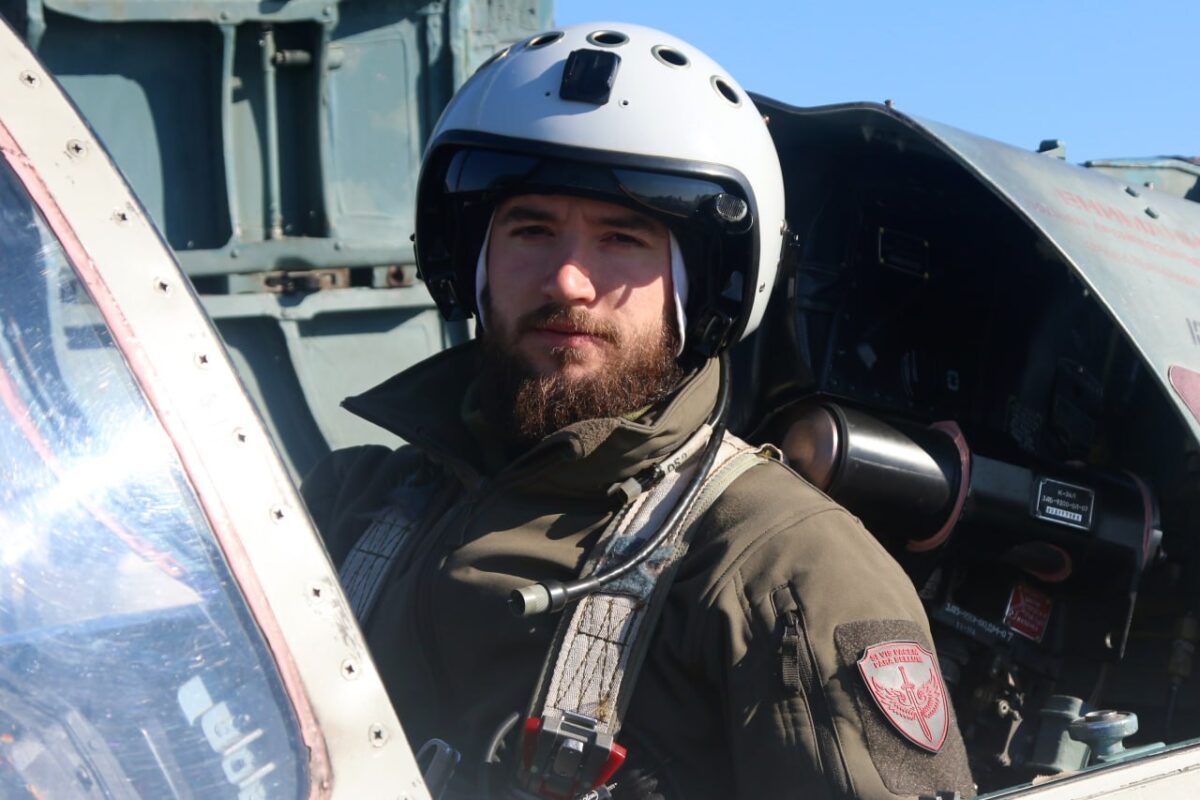
- Hero of Ukraine Rostyslav Lazarenko in the cockpit of a Su-25 Frogfoot
- Born: Rostyslav Pavlovych Lazarenko; 18 June 1994 (age 32); Uman, Cherkasy Oblast, Ukraine
- Alma mater: Ivan Kozhedub National Air Force University
- Military career
- Allegiance: Ukraine
- Branch: Ukrainian Air Force
- Service years: 2016–present
- Rank: Pidpolkovnyk
- Nickname: Hrim (Грім)
- Unit: 299th Tactical Aviation Brigade
- Conflicts: Russo-Ukrainian War; Russian invasion of Ukraine; Battle of Melitopol
- Awards: Hero of Ukraine; Order for Courage 3rd class

Rostyslav Pavlovych Lazarenko (Ukrainian: Ростислав Павлович Лазаренко; born 18 June 1994) is a Ukrainian military pilot, Lieutenant colonel of the Ukrainian Air Force of the Armed Forces of Ukraine, participant in the Russo-Ukrainian war. Hero of Ukraine (2023).

== Biography ==
In 2016, he graduated from the Ivan Kozhedub National Air Force University and joined the Tactical Aviation Brigade of the Air Force of the Armed Forces of Ukraine as a lieutenant. It was his course that became the first in this military university to master combat aircraft during his studies.

During the Russian-Ukrainian war, he was the commander of the 299th Tactical Aviation Brigade.

Major Rostyslav Lazarenko met the full-scale Russian invasion of Ukraine in the city of Melitopol, on the night of February 23–24, 2022, he was the senior of the task force. On the first day, he destroyed a column of Russian armored vehicles near the village of Chaplynka.

As of 6 August 2023, he had flown 360 combat missions, including 58 from 18 May to 1 July 2022.

As of 6 December 2023, it has 438 combat sorties.

== Awards ==
- The title of Hero of Ukraine with the "Order of the Gold Star" (2023)
- Cross of Military Merit (2022)
- Order of Bohdan Khmelnytsky, I, II and III class (2022)
- Order for Courage, III class (2023)

Rostyslav Lazarenko is the record holder among the pilots of the Air Force of Ukraine for the number of combat missions, with 300 such flights.

== Military ranks ==
- Major
- Pidpolkovnyk (2022)
