= Ivan Chernenko =

Ukrainian military aviator (1954–2006)

- Іван Черненко
- Born: Ivan Fadiiovych Chernenko; 1954
- Died: 15 April 2006 (aged 51–52); Africa
- Military career
- Allegiance: Ukraine
- Branch: Ukrainian Air Force
- Service years: 1977—2000
- Rank: Colonel
- Unit: 831st Tactical Aviation Brigade
- Conflicts: Afghan War
- Awards: Order for Courage; Order of the Red Star

Ivan Fadiiovych Chernenko (Ukrainian: Іван Фадійович Черненко, 1954 — 15 April 2006, Africa) was a Ukrainian military pilot ace 1st class, Colonel of the Air Force of the 831st Tactical Aviation Brigade of the Armed Forces of Ukraine, a participant of the Afghan War.

== Biography ==
Chernenko graduated from the Chernihiv Higher Military Aviation School of Pilots.

In 1977, Lieutenant Ivan Chernenko began his service in a fighter regiment flying a MiG-21 (Kakaydy airfield, Central Asia).

For a year and a half he performed combat missions in Afghanistan. From 1979 to 1981, he was a senior pilot of the unit, and then a unit commander, Senior Lieutenant Ivan Chernenko, who flew about 300 combat missions with 260 hours of flight time. Later he served in the 4th Air Force in Poland. In the 1980s, he was transferred to the 831st Fighter Aviation Regiment, which was then re-equipped with the most modern 4th generation Su-27 fighter aircraft.

In 1998, he became the only pilot in the history of Ukraine to fly a transatlantic flight from Myrhorod to Seymour Johnson Air Force Base in a Su-27UB fighter jet.

In 1999, Colonel Ivan Chernenko took part in the air parade of NATO aviation. He received the international certificate of "Display Pilot" (registered in Ukraine under No. 2).

During the entire period of service, Ivan Chernenko mastered six types of aircraft and had 2500 hours of flight time. He participated in international shows and demonstrations in Turkey, the UK, Bulgaria, Romania, Slovakia, and the Czech Republic. Among his students are Oleksandr Oksanchenko and Fedir Tyshchuk.

In 2000, the commander of the 831st VAP retired from the service. He worked as a pilot-instructor in an aviation unit in Africa, where he died on 15 April 2006 as a result of a car accident.

== Awards ==
- Order for Courage, 3rd class (23 November 1998)
- Order of the Red Star
- Man of the Year according to the Golden Fortune magazine (1998)
