= Oleksandr Korpan =

Ukrainian military pilot (1994–2022)

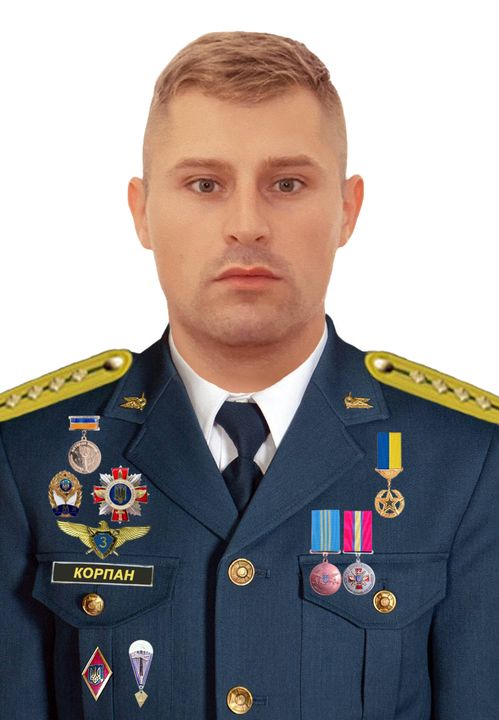
- Native name: Олександр Богданович Корпан
- Born: Oleksandr Bohdanovych Korpan; 8 September 1994; Starokostiantyniv, Khmelnytskyi Oblast, Ukraine
- Died: 2 March 2022 (aged 27) Starokostiantyniv, Khmelnytskyi Oblast, Ukraine
- Allegiance: Ukraine
- Branch: Ukrainian Air Force
- Rank: Captain
- Conflicts: Russo-Ukrainian War; Russian invasion of Ukraine †
- Awards: Order of the Gold Star (posthumously)

Oleksandr Bohdanovych Korpan (Ukrainian: Олександр Богданович Корпан; 8 September 1994 – 2 March 2022) was a Ukrainian military pilot (captain) of the Ukrainian Air Force of the Armed Forces of Ukraine, and a participant in the Russo-Ukrainian war. He is Hero of Ukraine (2022).

== Life ==
Korpan was born in Starokostiantyniv, Khmelnytskyi Oblast.

He graduated from music school and Kharkiv Military University.

He served in the 299th Tactical Aviation Brigade named after General Vasily Nikoforov as commander of the aviation squadron of this brigade.

Korpan died on 2 March 2022 during a combat flight in the airspace over Starokostiantyniv.

He was buried on 7 March 2022 at the cemetery in Halych, Ternopil Oblast.

== Awards ==
- the title of Hero of Ukraine with the award of the Order of the Golden Star (2022, posthumously) — for personal courage and heroism shown in the defense of the state sovereignty and territorial integrity of Ukraine, loyalty to the military oath.
- commemorative badge of the Commander of the Air Force of the Armed Forces of Ukraine "Martial kill, honor, courage" (2016)
- honorary badge of the Commander-in-Chief of the Armed Forces of Ukraine "For achievements in military service".
- 10 Years of Conscientious Service medal
