= Znosychi =

Rural locality in Rivne Oblast, Ukraine

Nemovychi Зносичі
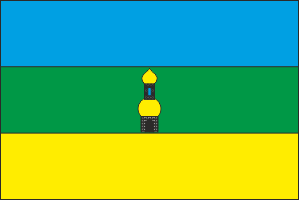
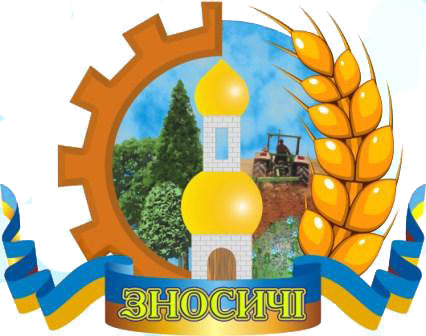
- Flag Coat of arms

- Location in Rivne Oblast
- Coordinates: 51°12′40″N 26°41′52″E
- Country: Ukraine
- Oblast: Rivne Oblast
- Raion: Sarny Raion
- Hromada: Nemovychi Hromada
- Time zone: UTC+2 (EET)
  - Summer (DST): UTC+3 (EEST)
- Postal code: 34545

Znosychi (Ukrainian: Зносичі) is a village in Ukraine, Rivne Oblast, Sarny Raion, Nemovychi rural hromada.

== History ==
The first written mention dates back to the 18th century.

== People ==
- Fedir Tyshchuk, Ukrainian military pilot ace 1st class
