= 299th Tactical Aviation Brigade =

Military unit of the Ukrainian Air Force

- 299-та бригада тактичної авіації
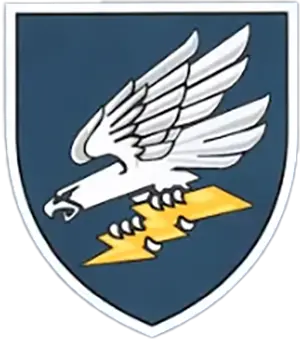
- Active: 4 November 1976 – present
- Country: Ukraine; Soviet Union (1976–1991)
- Allegiance: Armed Forces of Ukraine
- Branch: Ukrainian Air Force
- Type: Air Force Aviation
- Role: Close air support
- Size: Brigade
- Part of: Air Command South
- Garrison/HQ: Kulbakino Air Base, Mykolaiv Oblast
- Nickname: Vasyl Nikiforov
- Patron: Vasyl Nikiforov
- Engagements: Soviet–Afghan War: Russo-Ukrainian War; War in Donbas; Russian invasion of Ukraine
- Decorations: For Courage and Bravery

Commanders
- Current commander: Colonel Oleksandr Dyakov

Insignia
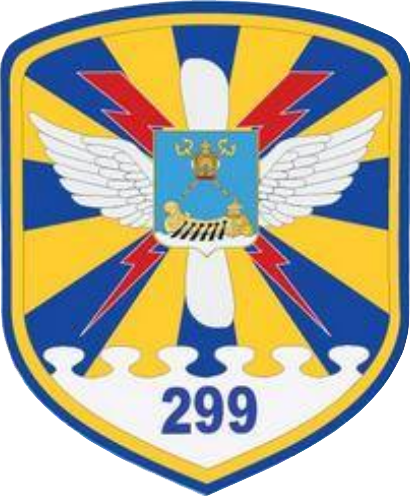
- Former Shoulderpatch

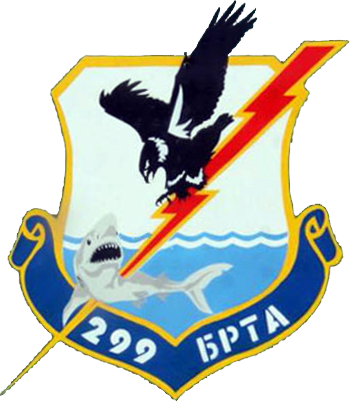
- Former Insignia

- Roundel

- Fin flash

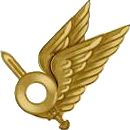
- Aviation branch insignia

Aircraft flown
- Attack: Sukhoi Su-25
- Trainer: Aero L-39 Albatros

The 299th Tactical Aviation Brigade named after Vasyl Nikiforov (MUN A4465) is a formation of the Ukrainian Air Force based at Kulbakino Air Base, Mykolaiv Oblast. The unit is equipped with Sukhoi Su-25 attack aircraft and is tasked with providing close air support for the Ukrainian Ground Forces and the Ukrainian Navy. It is subordinated to Air Command South headquartered at Odesa and has some 950 servicemen. Initially the airbase operated solely Su-25s but in November 2007 it inherited some 20 Aero L-39 Albatros trainer aircraft from a disbanded unit. Known operational aircraft as of 2016 are 13 L-39Cs and 23 Su-25s (of which 5 are Su-25UBs). As of late 2025 it could be up to 26, including possibly 8 Su-25UBs.

== History ==
=== Soviet era ===
On 4 November 1976, the unit was established as the 299th Instructor-Research Shipborne Aviation Regiment of Soviet Naval Aviation at Saky Air Base, Crimea. It operated a squadron of Yakovlev Yak-38s and a squadron of Mikoyan-Gurevich MiG-21s. By June 1979, the unit was known as the 299th Ship-Based Attack Regiment (299 KShAP). Between 4 April and 9 June 1980, the unit deployed three Yak-38s to Shindand Air Base, Herat Province, during the Soviet–Afghan War to test the aircraft's combat abilities.

Beginning in September 1989, the regiment began to re-equip with the Sukhoi Su-25, with the transition completed by 3 July 1991. The transition to the Su-25 led to the regiment being renamed the 299th Independent Maritime Assault Aviation Regiment (299 OShAP) in 1990.

=== Ukrainian era ===
On 24 August 1991, Ukraine declared independence from the Soviet Union, which was approved via a referendum on 1 December. In January 1992, the regiment was renamed the 299th Independent Assault Aviation Regiment. On 17 March 1992, the 299th was officially incorporated into the Ukrainian Armed Forces.

On 1 September 2003, the regiment became the 299th Tactical Aviation Brigade (299 BrTA).

Russo-Ukrainian war

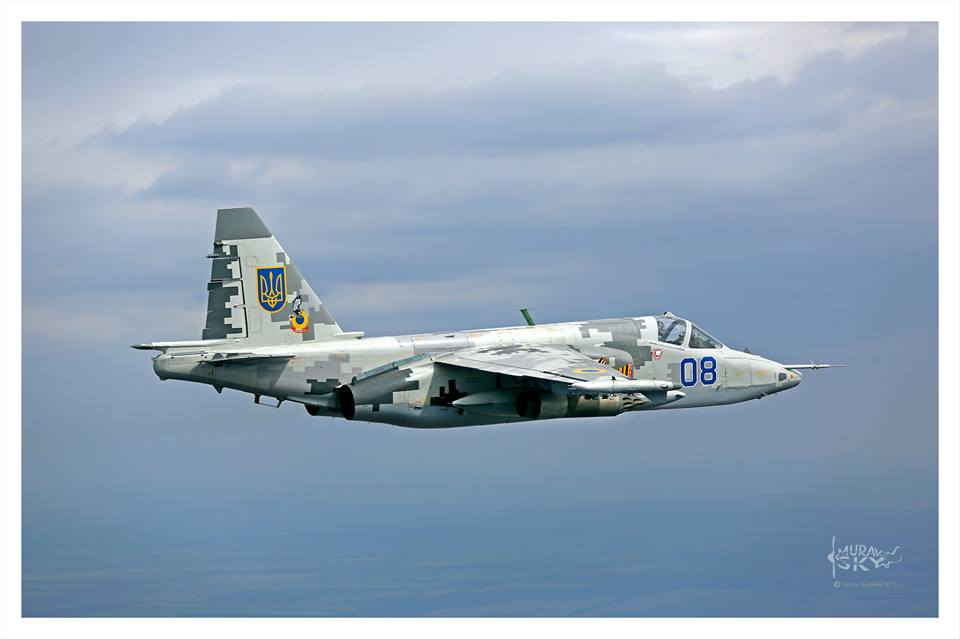
Blue 08 piloted by Vladyslav Voloshin, shot down by Russian air defense on August 29, 2014 during the battles for Ilovaisk.

Since 2014, the brigade participated in hostilities as part of the government operation against Pro-Russian rebels in Donbas.

On 2 July 2014, a Su-25, call sign Blue 06, crashed due to a technical fault while landing at Dnipropetrovsk International Airport. The pilot ejected safely.

On the morning of 16 July 2014, Su-25 call sign Blue 03, was shot down over eastern Ukraine near Amvrosiivka town, and the pilot ejected successfully. National Security Council spokesman Andriy Lysenko said that it was shot down by a missile fired from a Russian Mikoyan MiG-29.

On 23 July 2014, two Su-25 strike fighters, call sign Blue 04 and Blue 33 were shot down in the rebel-held area of Savur-Mohyla. Ukrainian authorities claimed that they were hit by long-range anti-aircraft missiles launched from Russia. Ukrainian Prime Minister, Arseniy Yatsenyuk, said later in an interview that one of the attack planes was probably shot down by an air-to-air missile.

On 29 August 2014, a pair of Su-25 after returning from a mission on Kuteynikov, were attacked by enemy fire. Blue 08, piloted by Vladislav Voloshin, was shot down near Starobeshevo by a surface-to-air missile during the battle of Ilovaisk. The pilot, Captain Vladyslav Voloshyn, ejected and after 4 days was able to reach Ukrainian-controlled territory, was secured by a unit of the Ukrainian National Guard.

Later service

The 299th TAB suffered the loss of two Su-25 strike aircraft due to accidents. The first on 11 November 2015, when strike aircraft call sign Blue 07 piloted by Lieutenant Yegor Bolshakov crashed after colliding with high voltage transmission lines, the pilot died. Another strike aircraft, Blue 38 was lost on 14 July 2016 at Starokostiantyniv Air Base, after a failed take off.

== Organization ==
The active Aircraft are most likely organized into 3 combat groups. Two consisting of 10-12 single seat Su-25s and the last fielding the remaining two seat Su-25UBs. The latter operates in the rear, mostly for training puropses. In total, the brigade has around 30 active pilots flying combat sorties.

- Unit Headquarters
  - 1st Aviation Squadron
  - TEC of Aviation and Automotive Equipment
  - 344th Guard Battalion

== Equipment ==
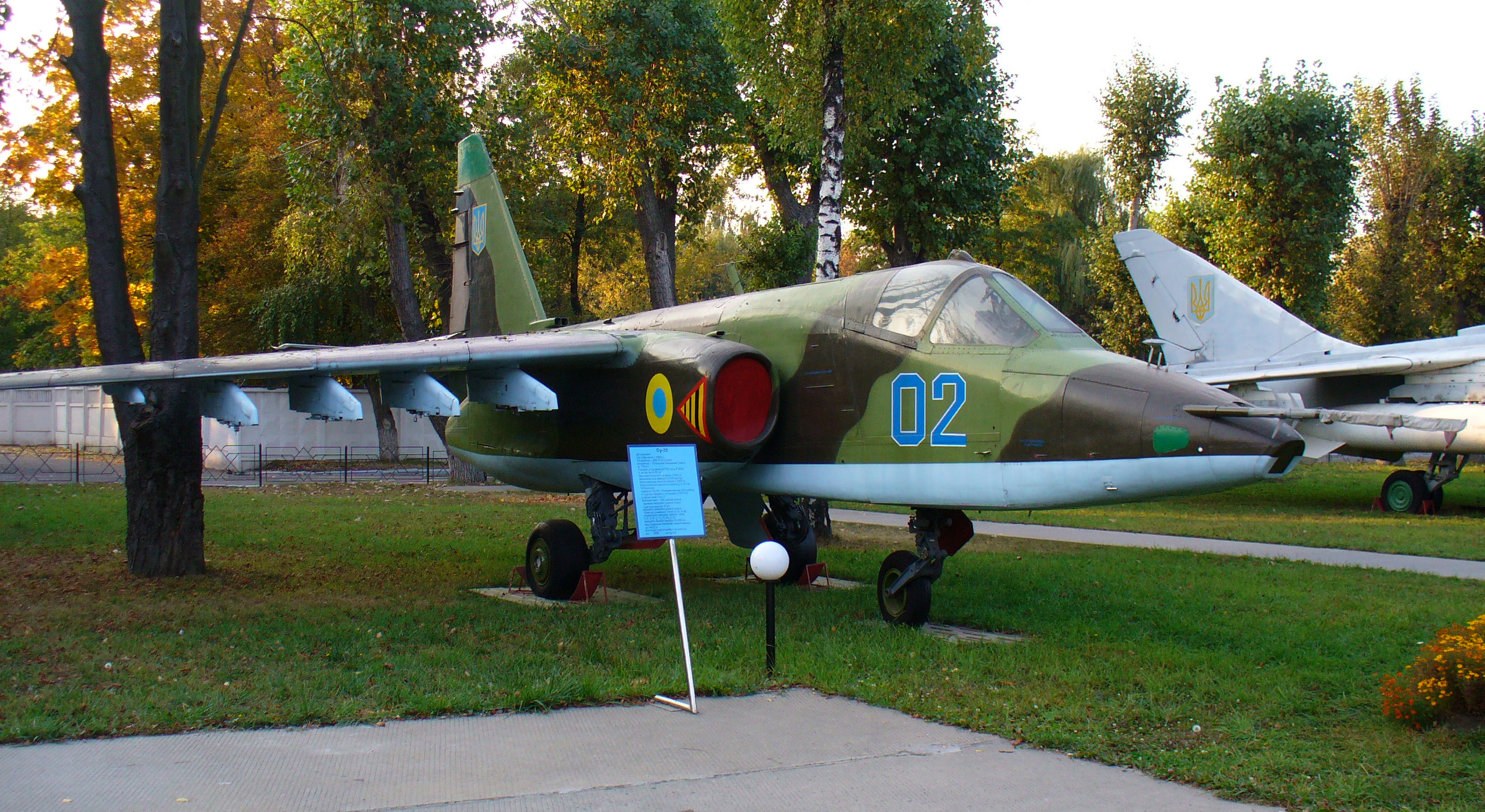
Ukrainian legacy Su-25 in the Ukrainian Air Force Museum in Vinnytsya

=== Su-25 ===
The Su-25 is the basic production model of the series, originally developed and built in the Soviet Union.

=== Su-25UB ===
Two-seat trainer variant of the basic Su-25, retaining full combat capability.

=== Su-25M1 and Su-25UBM1 ===
The Su-25M1 is the first Ukrainian upgrade package for the Su-25 and the 2008 standard, developed exclusively for the Ukrainian Air Force. It features modernized avionics and additional flare dispenser racks as part of its improved self-protection suite.

The aircraft updated to this standard also received the famous "Pixel" paint scheme, originally in green. Only a few aircraft retain the green pixel scheme, with most now painted in grey, especially after reactivation. Additionally, the "Anti-Mykola" paint scheme was standardized some time after 2022 to avoid friendly fire.

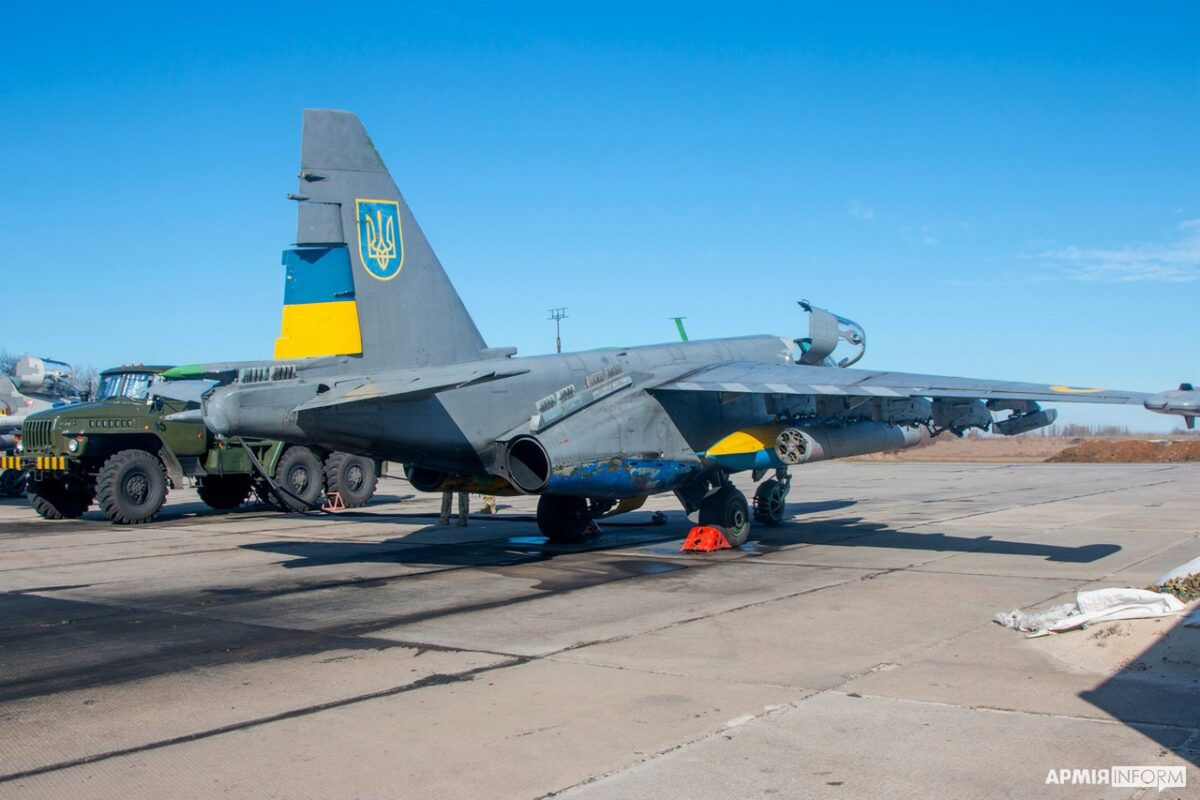
Su-25M1K in 2023 with "Anti-Mykola" paint scheme

=== Su-25M1K and Su-25UBM1K ===
From 2015 onwards, the M1K upgrade package was established as the new standard, with most active airframes planned to be upgraded to this standard over time. This was in accordance with the state defence order calling for repairs of 24 aircraft from the total inventory of 39 Su-25/Su-25UBs in Ukraine inventory. The M1K features Ukrainian-designed equipment such as the new nav-attack system for precise weapons delivery from higher altitudes. Key equipment includes the S-17BC8-M1 digital sight, Kharkov Aviakontrol OJSC audio and video recording system, the С-3307 satellite navigation system receiver by Orizon-Navigation, and a modernized radio station. The M1K upgrade differs by adding the Adros KUV 26-50-01 flare dispenser system.

== List of aircraft ==
Before the full scale invasion in 2022, the brigade consisted of 1 Su-25, 13 Su-25M1, 5 Su-25M1K, 3 Su-25UBM1, 2 Su-25UBM1K. During the war and until April 2023 some Su-25 stored or in reserve status were refitted for combat operations and four more were acquired from the Republic of North Macedonia. Two were made airworthy again and are now serving as Blue 50 and 51.

Tail Number	Type	Status	Note
Blue 15	Su-25M1K	Operational as of 2023	
Blue 16	Su-25M1	Shot down - 26 July 2022.	Pilot Oleksandr Kukurba died while flying a combat mission defending Ukrainian skies.
Blue 17	Su-25M1	Damaged beyond repair - Destroyed on the ground on 22 March 2022 by Russian jetfighters on Melitopol.	Pilot Rostyslav Lazarenko survived and managed to land the aircraft.
Blue 19	Su-25M1	Shot down - 26 February 2022 in Kherson region.	Pilot Lt. Col Oleksander Zhibrov was killed.
Blue 20	Su-25M1	Operational as of 2023	
Blue 21	Su-25M1	Shot down - 7 February 2024 by a Russian Su-35.	Pilot Vladyslav Rykov was killed.
Blue 22	Su-25M1	Operational as of 2023	
Blue 23	Su-25M1	Non operational before loss on September 2024.	Wreckage recorded in Kulbakino Airfield in a Ukrainian documentary.
Blue 24	Su-25M1	Operational as of 2023	
Blue 25	Su-25M1	Operational as of 2023	
Blue 27	Su-25M1	Shot down - 14 December 2022.	Pilot Vladislav Solop died.
Blue 28	Su-25M1	Operational as of 2025	Modified to carry French made AASM Hammer stand-off weapon
Blue 29	Su-25M1	Shot down - 2 March 2022, over Starokostiantyniv, Khmelnytskyi Oblast.	Pilot Capt. Oleksandr Korpan died.
Blue 30	Su-25M1	Shot down - 26 February 2022 in Kherson region.	Pilot Capt. Oleksander Scherbakov died.
Blue 31	Su-25M1K	Shot down - 26 February 2022 near Fedorivka, Kherson Oblast.	Pilot Capt. Andriy Antikhovich died.
Blue 32	Su-25M1K	Operational as of 2023	
Blue 35	Su-25M1K	Operational as of 2023	
Blue 36	Su-25M1K	Operational as of 2023	
Blue 37	Su-25M1	Shot down - 27 January 2023 near Kramatorsk.	Pilot Danilo Murashko died.
Blue 39	Su-25M1	Shot down - 27 February 2022 near Hlibivka Vyshgorod, Kyiv region.	Pilot Gennady Matulyak died.
Blue 40	Su-25M1K	Shot down - 3 March 2022 on Mykolaiv	Captain Vadim Moroz was killed.
Blue 41	Su-25M1	Operational as of 2023	According to the Ukraine Ministry of Defence it was hit with MANPADS, on July 16, 2014. The pilot was forced to land.
Blue 44	Su-25	Refit since 2011. Current state unkwown.	
Blue 45	Su-25M1K	Shot down - 14 May 2022 in Huliaipole, Zaporizhzhia Oblast.	Captain Serhiy Parkhomenko was killed
Blue 46	Su-25M1	Operational as of 2023	
Blue 47	Su-25M1K	Operational as of 2025	Modified to carry French made AASM Hammer stand-off weapon
Blue 48	Su-25M1K	Operational as of 2023	
Blue 49	Su-25M1	Shot down - Wreck found in Kherson region.	Pilot Andrey Maksinov was captured by Russian forces, he was interviewed by Russian media.
Blue 50	Su-25M1K	Operational as of 2023	Ex-Macedonian 122 or 123
Blue 51	Su-25M1K	Operational as of 2023	Ex-Macedonian 121
Blue 60	Su-25UBM1K		
Blue 61	Su-25UBM1K		
Blue 62	Su-25UBM1		
Blue 63	Su-25UBM1	Operational in 2021	
Blue 64	Su-25UBM1		
Blue 67	Su-25UBM1K		
Blue 120	Su-25UBM1K	Airworthiness not ensured	Ex-Belarussian then Ex-Macedonian 120
122 or 123	Su-25	unknown	The last of the Ex-Macedonian Airframes is either 122 C/N 25508110188 or 123 C/N 25508107039

Another 12 unidentified Su-25 aircraft were reported lost.

On 26 February 2022, a Su-25, in grey camouflage painting was destroyed in the ground at Kulbakino Air Base, Mykolaiv Oblast.

On 6 March 2022, a Su-25 was lost in Snihurivka, Mykolaiv Oblast according to the Ukrainian Mayor of Mykolaiv and Russian sources that reported the shotdown of a Ukrainian Su-25 by a Russian Su-35.

On 14 March 2022, a Su-25 was shot down by Russian forces in Volnovakha, Donbas region. The pilot, Roman Vasyliuk, captured by Russian forces was later released on 24 April, by a Russo-Ukrainian prisoner swap.

On 10 April 2022, a Su-25 was destroyed in the ground inside a hangar at Dnipro Airbase by Russian rocket attacks, one Ukrainian technician was wounded as well.

On 15 April 2022, Russian forces shot down a Su-25 in Izium, the Pilot Yegor Seredyuk was reported dead. Seredyuk was awarded with the Hero of Ukraine order.

On 7 September 2022, Ukrainian media reported the death of pilot Vadim Blagovisnyi while flying a combat mission on a Su-25.

On 19 September 2022, the remains of a Su-25, were found in Yehorivka, Donetsk Oblast. The aircraft was destroyed by a Russian 9K33 Osa.

On 6 January 2023, a Ukrainian Su-25 was recorded being shot down by a MANPAD over Bakhmut, the engines of the aircraft were recorded later on Bakhmut streets in April 2023 by Russian media.

On 10 October 2023, a Su-25 was destroyed by a ZALA Lancet drone attack on the tarmac of Dolgintsevo air base near Kryvyi Rih Air Base.

On 6 June 2024, a Su-25 was damaged beyond repair by a Lancet loitering munition drone at the Kryvyi Rih air base. Another Su-25 was destroyed by a Lancet loitering munition drone on 11 June at the Kryvyi Rih air base..

On 29 July, another Su-25 was destroyed in the ground by Russian Lancet strike in Kryvyi Rih.

== Bibliography ==
Golz, Alexander; Cooper, Rich. Ukraine's Attack Workhorse. Air Forces Monthly, June 2017. pp. 74–81. Stanford, UK: Key Publishing Ltd.
