= Myrhorod Air Base =

Airport

Myrhorod
- Аеропорт «Миргород»
- Myrhorod, Poltava Oblast in Ukraine
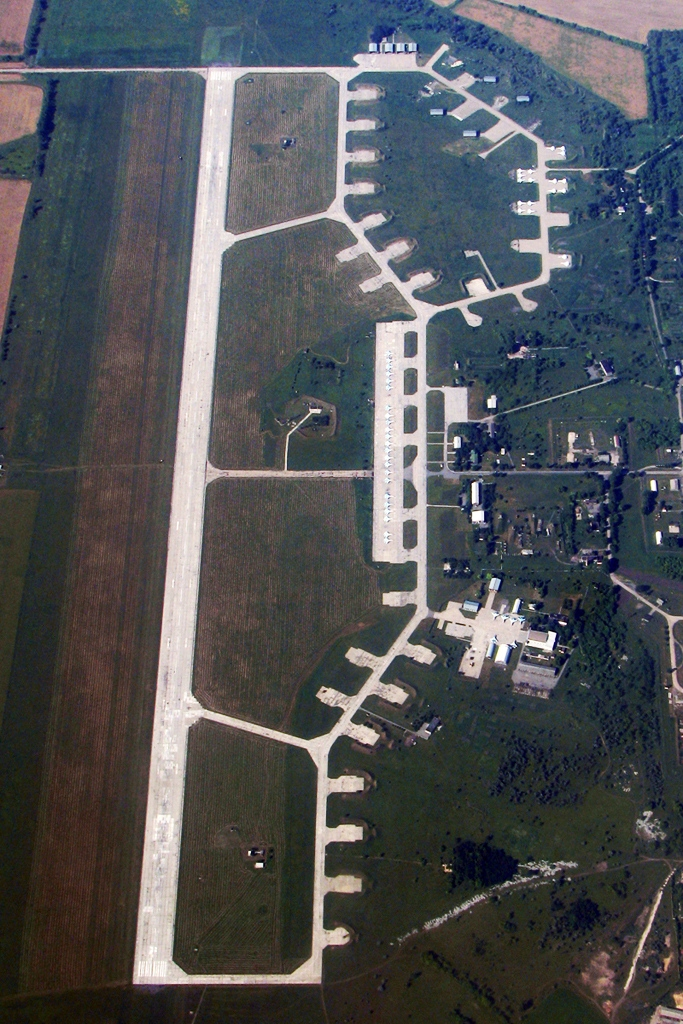

Site information
- Owner: Ministry of Defence
- Operator: Ukrainian Air Force
- Controlled by: Air Command Central

Location
- Shown within Poltava Oblast Myrhorod (Ukraine)
- Coordinates: 49°55′54″N 033°38′22″E

Site history
- In use: Unknown - present
- Battles/wars: 2022 Russian invasion of Ukraine

Airfield information
- Identifiers: IATA: MXR, ICAO: UKBM
- Elevation: 83 metres (272 ft) AMSL
Runways
| Direction | Length and surface |
|---|---|
| 04/22 | 2,500 metres (8,202 ft) Concrete |
- Sources: GCM, ASN

Myrhorod (ICAO: UKBM) is an air base of the Ukrainian Air Force located near Myrhorod, Poltava Oblast, Ukraine.

Until the 2022 Russian invasion of Ukraine, the base was home to the 831st Tactical Aviation Brigade flying Sukhoi Su-27P/UB aircraft.

== History ==
In May 1944 the airfield was provided to the United States Army Air Forces as a heavy bomber staging field. It was used by the Eighth and Fifteenth Air Forces for shuttle bombing missions during June through September 1944 (Operation Frantic).

Myrhorod was designated as USAAF Station 561 for security purposes and was referred to as Station 561 in all messages and written correspondence. Myrhorod was one of three Ukraine installations operated by Headquarters, Eastern Command, United States Strategic Air Forces. The others were nearby Poltava, where USAAF Eastern Command Headquarters was located, and Pyriatyn.

Aircraft would land at the field from either Great Britain or Southern Italy after attacking Axis targets in Eastern Europe. The aircraft would refuel and rearm at the airport, then attack other targets on return missions to Southern Italy.

Shuttle bombing operations under Operation Frantic ended in September 1944, and the Americans consolidated operations at Poltava for the remainder of the war.

On the night of 21 June 1944, the field was targeted by a massive German strike force. Unable to find Myrhorod, this force augmented the bombers attacking Poltava. The next night, however, the Germans bombed Myrhorod. By then, flyable aircraft had been evacuated from the field, and the losses were confined to fuel and ammunition stores.

After the war, the airfield was rebuilt and used as a Soviet Air Forces base. Dispersal hardstands were attached to each end of a new single runway, expanded for jet aircraft use, along with a large aircraft parking ramp, with at least six hangars.

The 831st Fighter Aviation Regiment (138th Fighter Aviation Division) arrived at the base in 1977, transferred from Boryspil in Kyiv Oblast.

=== After 1991 end of Soviet era ===
On January 13, 1992, the regiment took the oath of allegiance to the Ukrainian people. Today it is the 831st Tactical Aviation Brigade of the Air Force of the Armed Forces of Ukraine. As part of the Armed Forces of Ukraine, the unit has always been and remains one of the most capable units of the Air Force.

=== After 2014 and Feb 2022 invasion by Russia ===
In April 2022, Russian attacks against the base destroyed an ammunition depot and damaged the runway and a fuel depot.

On the morning of 10 June 2023, Russia attacked the airfield using Iskander-M missiles. A Su-27 was damaged, likely beyond repair.

On 1 July 2024, the air base was again struck with Iskander-M ballistic missiles. Several Russian military bloggers said that two Su-27s were destroyed and four damaged as a result of the strike, while the Russian Ministry of Defense claimed that five Su-27s were destroyed and two were damaged. Ukraine confirmed equipment losses, without precising their number. It is unknown how many of the aircraft were in operational status.

== Aircraft ==
According to Google Earth imagery, as of 20 March 2020:

- 27 Sukhoi Su-27
- 4 L-39 Albatros
