= 831st Tactical Aviation Brigade =

Military unit of the Ukrainian Air Force

- 831-ша бригада тактичної авіації
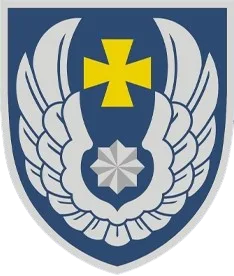
- Active: 27 November 1941 – present
- Country: Ukraine; Soviet Union (1941–1991)
- Allegiance: Armed Forces of Ukraine
- Branch: Ukrainian Air Force
- Type: Air Force Aviation
- Role: Fighter
- Size: Brigade
- Part of: Air Command West
- Garrison/HQ: Myrhorod Air Base, Poltava Oblast
- Nickname: Myrhorod
- Engagements: Russo-Ukrainian War; War in Donbas; Russian invasion of Ukraine
- Decorations: For Courage and Bravery
- Website: Official Facebook page

Commanders
- Current commander: Colonel Oleg Palivoda
- Notable commanders: Colonel Oleksandr Oksanchenko

Insignia
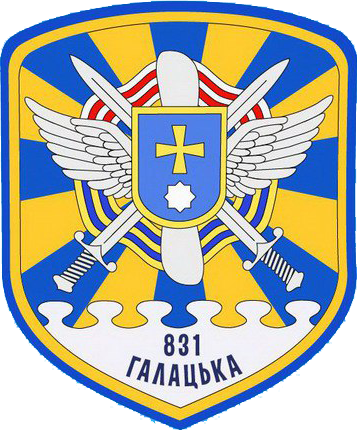
- Former sleeve patch

- Roundel

- Fin flash

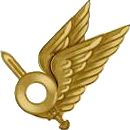
- Aviation branch insignia

Aircraft flown
- Fighter: Su-27, Su-27UB, SU-27M1 SU-27UB1M
- Trainer: L-39M1

The 831st Tactical Aviation Brigade Myrhorod (MUN A1356) is a formation of the Ukrainian Air Force. Based at Myrhorod Air Base, Poltava Oblast, the unit operates the Sukhoi Su-27 and Aero L-39M1.

== History ==
=== Soviet era ===
==== Second World War ====
The 659th Fighter Aviation Regiment was formed in Krasnovodsk (now Turkmenbashi Turkmenistan) on 27 November 1941. The regiment became part of the 'Active Army' on 8 January 1942, having commenced military operations as part of the 4th Mixed Aviation Division, 4th Shock Army, Kalinin Front. During the first two months of combat operations, the regiment carried out 123 sorties (13 of them, nightly), was involved in 13 air battles, shot down 8 enemy aircraft, and destroyed 22 motor vehicles, 112 wagons and two steam locomotives. In October 1942, the 659 IAP was subordinated to the 288th Fighter Aviation Division (288 IAD).

On 29 December 1944, for the courage and heroism of the regiments personnel, manifested in the liberation of the cities Galati and Izmail for which the regiment was awarded the honorary title "Galatsky". In 1945, for the execution of combat tasks during the Danube River overrun and the breakthrough of the enemy's defense, the regiment was awarded the Order of Kutuzov, III Degree, and for the liberation of Budapest, an Order of the Red Banner. By the end of the war in May 1945, the 659 IAP was based at Münchendorf Airfield in Austria.

During operations on the Eastern Front, the unit carried out 9960 combat missions in 10,451 hours, conducted 531 air battles, destroyed 417 planes and 838 units of military equipment.

==== Cold War ====
Having been based in the Balkans after the war, in October 1947 the 659 IAP relocated to Boryspil Air Base, Kyiv Oblast, in Ukraine. On 20 February 1949, the 659 IAP was renumbered as the 831st Fighter Aviation Regiment (831 IAP), with unit's parent division (288 IAD) becoming the 138 IAD, based on an order from the 10 January 1949. In 1949, the 831 IAP received their first jet aircraft – the Mikoyan-Gurevich MiG-15.

The regiment operated the Mikoyan-Gurevich MiG-17 between 1951 and 1966 before converting to the Mikoyan-Gurevich MiG-21.

In 1977, the 831 IAP relocated to Myrhorod Air Base, Poltava Oblast, from Boryspil Air Base. In 1985, the 831 IAP became the first front-line unit in the Soviet Air Forces to convert to the Sukhoi Su-27 "Flanker". Its first six Flankers were delivered on 10 November 1985, fully converting to the new platform on 27 October 1986.

=== Ukrainian era ===
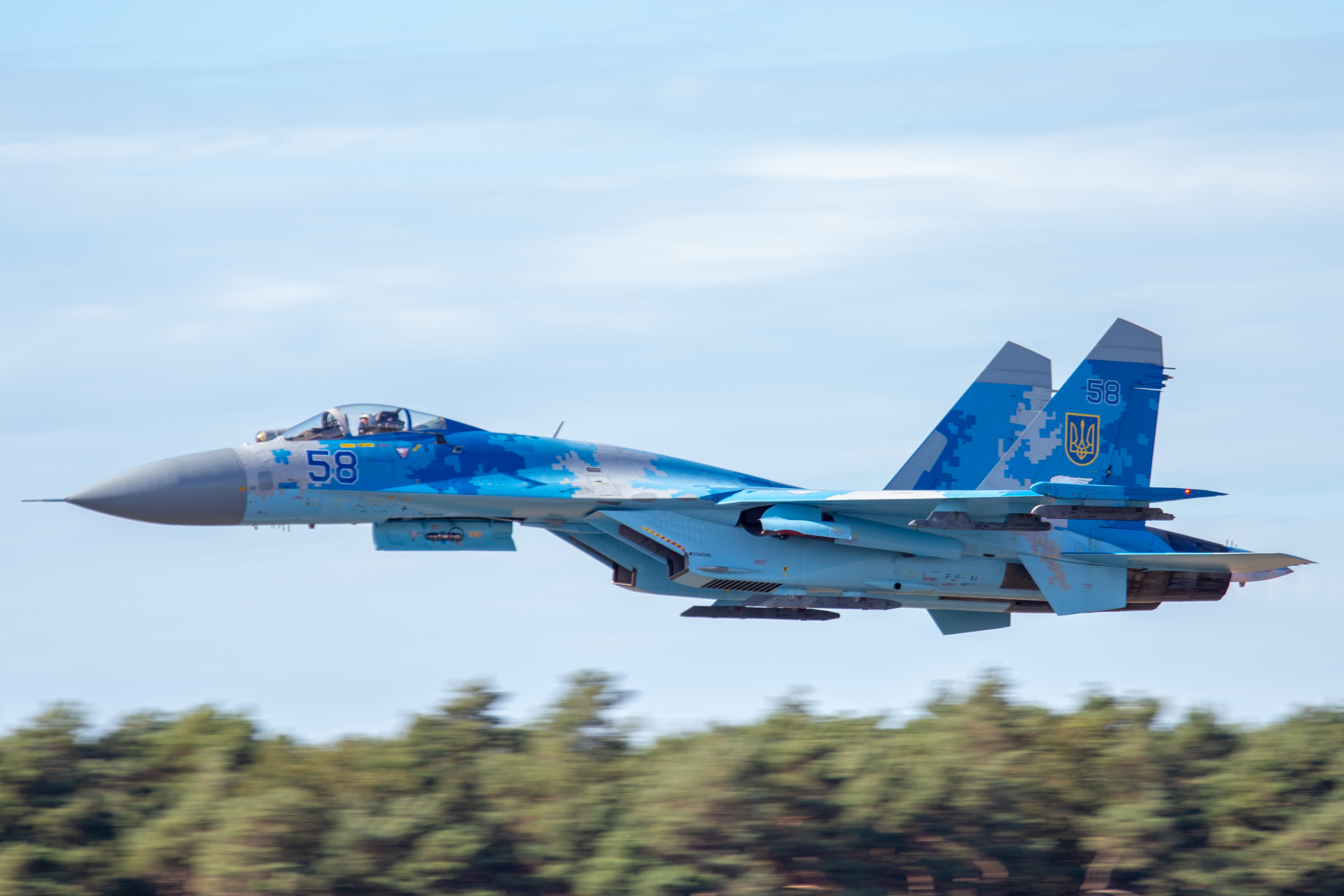
Sukhoi Su-27P1M Flanker Blue 58 of the 831 BrTA in flight, 2018.

Ukraine declared independence from the Soviet Union on 24 August 1991, which was approved via a referendum on 1 December. On 13 January 1992, the 831 IAP took an oath of loyalty to the Ukrainian people. The Ukrainian Air Force was established on 17 March 1992, with the 831 IAP becoming the 831 VAP.

In 1996, pilots of the Myrgorod regiment participated in a military parade to honour the 5th Independence Day of Ukraine, with four Su-27s accompanying a Tupolev Tu-160. In 1997, the 831 VAP hosted a visit from United States Air Force McDonnell Douglas F-15E Strike Eagles of the 4th Fighter Wing (4th FW). In June 1998, Colonel Ivan Chernenko conducted the first visit of a Ukrainian Su-27UB to the United States, flying to the home of the 4th FW at Seymour Johnson Air Force Base, North Carolina. In March 2000, 831 VAP was assigned to the 35th Aviation Group (35 AvG).

On 1 August 2003, the 831 VAP was reassigned to the 5th Aviation Corps (Ukraine) (5 AvK) leading to the regiment becoming the 831st Fighter Aviation Brigade (831 VABr). On 25 January 2005, the fighter air force was subordinated to the Air Command of the Air Force "Center" of the Armed Forces of Ukraine.

The Myrgorod regiment has participated in multiple international airshows throughout Europe, including in the United Kingdom, Czech Republic, Slovakia, Austria, Romania, and Turkey. During Slovak International Air Display 2004, Lieutenant-Colonel Fedir Tyshchuk's Su-27 display was recognised as the best individual flight.

In October 2007, the unit received its current name of the 831st Tactical Aviation Brigade (831 BrTA).

Between 19 and 26 July 2011, 'Safe Sky 2011' (a joint Ukrainian-American-Polish military exercise) was held in the Poltava region at which military aircraft and helicopters carried out anti-terrorist actions aimed at protecting against an attack. Su-27, MiG-29, L-39, Antonov An-26, An-26M "Rescuer", Mi-8, F-16C, and C-130 aircraft took part in the exercises. The 831st Brigade pilots interacted with the pilots of the 144th Fighter Wing, California Air National Guard.

The 831st Tactical Aviation Brigade marked its 70th anniversary on 27 November 2011 with a new Battle Flag.

Currently, the Brigade is a part of the Rapid Reaction Force in the system APO. Three planes are based on the Odesa school airfield.

On 10 February 2016, Ukrainian President Petro Poroshenko, by decree, named Su-27P1M Blue 50 of the 831 BrTA 'Vasyl Nikiforov' in honour of Lieutenant-General Vasyl Semenovych Nikiforov.

On 1 December 2018, the brigade received an upgraded Su-27S1M and two L-39 M1.

== Inventory ==
The 831st Tactical Aviation Brigade uses mostly Su-27 and its modifications, also the 39th Tactical Aviation Brigade operates this type of aircraft. The following table indicated all operational Su-27 being used by both formations.

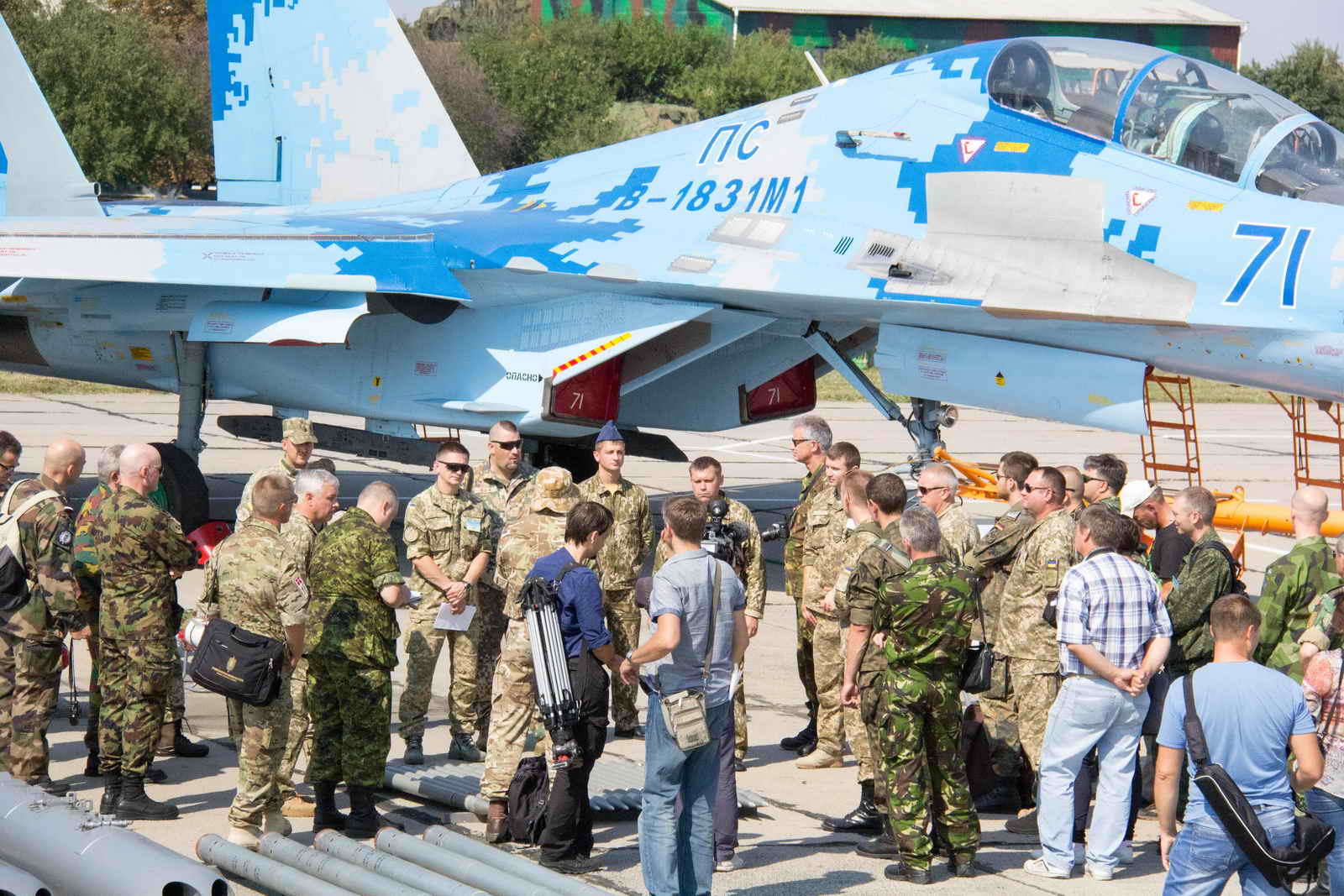
OSCE representatives in Myrhorod Air Base 2016. Su-27, Bort number Blue 71 can be seen at back

Tail Number	Type	Status	Unit	Note
Blue 04	Su-27S	Operational	831st Tactical Aviation Brigade	
Blue 08	Su-27S	Operational	831st Tactical Aviation Brigade	
Blue 11	Su-27S1M	Lost	831st Tactical Aviation Brigade	Shot down by MANPADS over Kropyvnytskyi, Kirovohrad Oblast on 28 February 2022. Pilot, Maj. Stepan Chobanu, was killed.
Blue 12	Su-27S1M	Operational	831st Tactical Aviation Brigade	
Blue 15	Su-27S	Operational	831st Tactical Aviation Brigade	
Blue 21	Su-27S1M	Operational	39th Tactical Aviation Brigade	
Blue 23	Su-27S1M	Operational	39th Tactical Aviation Brigade	
Blue 24	Su-27S1M	Operational	39th Tactical Aviation Brigade	
Blue 26	Su-27S	Damaged	39th Tactical Aviation Brigade	Damaged during a Russian attack on Kanatove Reserve Air Base.
Blue 27	Su-27S	Operational	831st Tactical Aviation Brigade	
Blue 28	Su-27S	Operational	831st Tactical Aviation Brigade	
Blue 30	Su-27S	Lost	831st Tactical Aviation Brigade	Lost on 28 March 2023 while shooting down Russian operated Shahed-136 drones near Myrhorod, Poltava. Pilot Major Denis Kirilyuk
Blue 31	Su-27S1M	Operational	831st Tactical Aviation Brigade	
Blue 33	Su-27S1M	Operational	831st Tactical Aviation Brigade	
Blue 36	Su-27S1M	Lost	39th Tactical Aviation Brigade	Shot down during Russian drone and missile attack 28 April 2025. The pilot Nikolay Klobnikin, ejected and survived.
Blue 37	Su-27 P1M	Lost	39th Tactical Aviation Brigade	Destroyed in the ground on Ozerne Air Base by a missile attack by forces of the Russian Federation on 24 February 2022.
Blue 38	Su-27S1M	Lost	831st Tactical Aviation Brigade	Shot down on June 5, 2022. Pilot Dmytro Fisher was killed.
Blue 39	Su-27 P1M	Operational	39th Tactical Aviation Brigade	
Blue 41	Su-27S	Operational	831st Tactical Aviation Brigade	
Blue 43	Su-27S1M	Operational	831st Tactical Aviation Brigade	
Blue 45	Su-27S	Operational	831st Tactical Aviation Brigade	
Blue 46	Su-27S	Damaged	39th Tactical Aviation Brigade	Damaged during a Russian attack on Kanatove Reserve Air Base.
Blue 47	Su-27S	Operational	831st Tactical Aviation Brigade	
Blue 48	Su-27S1M	Damaged	39th Tactical Aviation Brigade	Damaged during a Russian attack on Kanatove Reserve Air Base.
Blue 50	Su-27 P1M	Operational	831st Tactical Aviation Brigade	
Blue 52	Su-27S	Operational	831st Tactical Aviation Brigade	
Blue 53	Su-27S1M	Lost	39th Tactical Aviation Brigade	Shot down near Terezyne, Bila Tserkva Raion Kyiv Oblast, on 22 December 2023. Pilot Mayor Stanislav Romanenko died.
Blue 54	Su-27P1M	Operational	831st Tactical Aviation Brigade	
Blue 56	Su-27P1M	Operational	831st Tactical Aviation Brigade	
Blue 57	Su-27P1M	Operational	831st Tactical Aviation Brigade	
Blue 58	Su-27P1M	Lost	831st Tactical Aviation Brigade	Shot down on 10 October 2022 over Shyshaky Poltava Oblast.
Blue 59	Su-27P1M	Lost	831st Tactical Aviation Brigade	Shot down on 2 February 2025 by a Russian Su-30SM. Pilot Captain Ivan Bolotov was killed.
Blue 67	Su-27UP1M	Operational	831st Tactical Aviation Brigade	
Blue 69	Su-27UB	Operational	39th Tactical Aviation Brigade	
Blue 71	Su-27UB	Operational	831st Tactical Aviation Brigade	
Blue 73	Su-27UP2M	Lost	39th Tactical Aviation Brigade	Shot down on 17 May 2024 in the vicinity of Metalivka, Chuhuiv Raion, Kharkiv Oblast. The pilot, Lt. Col. Denys Vasyliuk, was killed.
Blue 74	Su-27UP	Operational	831st Tactical Aviation Brigade	
Blue 75	Su-27UB	Operational	831st Tactical Aviation Brigade	
Blue 100	Su-27P	Lost	831st Tactical Aviation Brigade	Shot down by Russian S-400 on 25 February 2022, over Kyiv. The pilot, Colonel Oleksandr Oksanchenko was killed.
Blue 101	Su-27P	Operational	831st Tactical Aviation Brigade	

Other 17 unidentified Su-27 were shot down, destroyed or damaged on the ground by Russian missile attacks:

On 24 February 2022, Lt. Colonel Eduard Vahorovskyi on its Su-27 was shot down near Ozerne airfield in Zhytomyr Oblast.

On 10 March 2022, at least one Su-27 was damaged or destroyed during Russian missile strike on Kanatove Air Base.

On 24 July 2022, three Su-27s were destroyed during a Russian missile strike on Kanatove Air Base, one official died and 17 other servicemen were injured.

On 21 August 2022 a Su-27 piloted by Lt. Col Pavlo Babych was lost during a combat mission in Barvinkove, the pilot died.

On 10 June 2024, a Su-27 was damaged beyond repair by an Iskander attack on Myrhorod Air Base.

On 1 July 2024, two Su-27s were destroyed and four damaged as a result of Russian Iskander-M missile strike on Myrhorod Air Base in Poltava Oblast.

On 12 August 2024, a Su-27 was destroyed in the ground at Myrhorod Air Base in Poltava, by a 9K720 Iskander missile.

On 11 September 2025, a Su-27 was lost during a combat mission in Zaporizhzhya front, the pilot Oleksandr M. Borovyk from 39th Tatical Aviation Brigade died.

On 8 December 2025, a Su-27 was lost during a combat mission along the pilot Yevgeny Ivanov from the 39th Tactical Aviation Brigade.

In March 2026, a Su-27 piloted by the Commander of the 39th Tactical Aviation Brigade Col. Oleksandr Dovhach was shot down in a combat mission.

== Aircraft operated ==
Aircraft operated include:

- Polikarpov I-15bis (1941–1942)
- Yakovlev Yak-1 (1942–1943)
- Yakovlev Yak-7b (1942–1944)
- Yakovlev Yak-1b (1943–1944)
- Yakovlev Yak-9 (1944–1945)
- Yakovlev Yak-3 (1945–1949)
- Mikoyan-Gurevich MiG-15 (1949–1951)
- Mikoyan-Gurevich MiG-17 (1951–1966)
- Mikoyan-Gurevich MiG-21PFM (1966–1968)
- Mikoyan-Gurevich MiG-21SM (1968–1973)
- Mikoyan-Gurevich MiG-21bis (1973–1985)
- Sukhoi Su-27 (1985–present)
- Aero L-39C (2012–2018)
- Aero L-39M1 (2018–present)

== Accidents ==
- On 16 October 2018, during the multinational exercises Clean Sky-2018, an Su-27UB airplane of the brigade ("70 Blue") crashed at about 17.00 during a training flight in the field near the village of Ulan, Vinnitsa Oblast. An international air crew including Colonel Ivan N. Nikolaevich Petrenko, the Deputy Commander of aviation, the chief of Aviation Air Command East, and a serviceman of the U.S. Air National Guard, were killed.
