= Hennadii Matuliak =

Ukrainian soldier (1977–2022)

- Born: Hennadii Vasylovych Matuliak; 29 April 1977; Martynivske, Mykolaiv Oblast, Ukraine
- Died: 25 February 2022 (aged 44); Hlybivka, Kyiv Oblast, Ukraine
- Children: 2
- Military career
- Allegiance: Ukraine
- Branch: Ukrainian Air Force
- Service years: 1994–2022
- Rank: Colonel
- Conflicts: Russo-Ukrainian War; Russian invasion of Ukraine
- Awards: Order of the Gold Star (posthumously)

Hennadii Vasyliovych Matuliak (Ukrainian: Геннадій Васильович Матуляк; April 29, 1977 – February 25, 2022) was a Ukrainian military officer, colonel, and the commander of the 1st Aviation Squadron of the 299th Tactical Aviation Brigade. He was a pilot of MiG-29, L-39, and Su-25 aircraft. He was awarded the title of Hero of Ukraine posthumously in 2022.

== Biography ==
Matuliak was born on April 29, 1977, in Martynivske village, Mykolaiv Oblast. His parents were from Ivano-Frankivsk Oblast, and his father was an aviation technician.

He served for over 10 years in the 299th Brigade of Tactical Aviation named after Lieutenant General V. Nikiforov (Military Unit A4465, Mykolaiv) of the Tactical Aviation Command of the Air Force of the Armed Forces of Ukraine. He flew MiG-29, L-39, and Su-25 aircraft. In total, he served for 28 years, with over 20 years of flying experience.

As of 2011, he held the position of a flight lieutenant.

By the summer of 2015, he became the head of intelligence at the military unit's headquarters.

He remarried in 2017.

From the first day, he took part in repelling the full-scale Russian invasion of Ukraine.

On February 24, 2022, he destroyed enemy columns over the Kherson region and his native Mykolaiv region.

On the morning of February 25, 2022, near the city of Hostomel in northern Kyiv, he heroically destroyed a column of Russian occupiers' vehicles. Afterward, he flew back to continue his work in the Kyiv region. However, around 7 a.m., during an aerial combat, a Russian fighter jet hit Matuliak's plane, with him as the lead pilot. He began maneuvering the aircraft to protect the village, as there was a large entertainment complex located beneath him. He even managed to activate the ejection seat, but after the second hit, both the aircraft and the pilot caught fire. The plane crashed a few kilometers away from Hlybivka village in Vyshhorod district, in a forest strip. The aircraft was about to fall on residential houses, but in the final seconds of his life, the pilot diverted the falling aircraft away from the residential area and crashed it into the forest. He was buried by local residents near the crash site.

On April 16, 2022, he was reburied in Mykolaiv. The requiem took place at the Cathedral of the Caspian Icon of the Mother of God.

Hennadii is survived by his wife Olha and two children, son Ruslan and daughter Sofiya.

== Awards ==
He was awarded the title of Hero of Ukraine with the Order of the Gold Star on February 28, 2022, posthumously, for personal courage and heroism demonstrated in defense of Ukraine's state sovereignty and territorial integrity, as well as for his loyalty to the military oath.

== Memorial Tribute ==
- In 2022, a street in Kyiv was named after him.
- On February 25, 2023, a memorial in honor of Colonel Hennadii Matuliak was opened at the site of the aircraft crash.
