= Andrii Zahorodniuk =

Ukrainian entrepreneur and politician

- Андрій Загороднюк
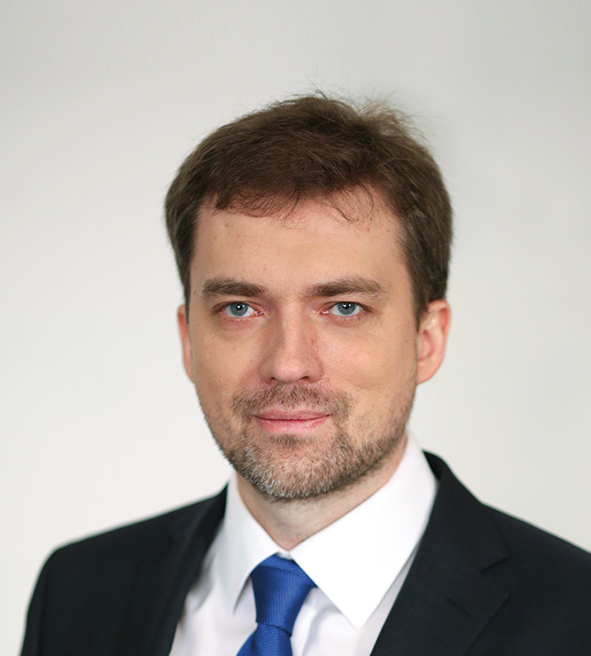

15th Minister of Defence of Ukraine
- In office 29 August 2019 – 4 March 2020
- President: Volodymyr Zelenskyy
- Prime Minister: Oleksiy Honcharuk
- Preceded by: Stepan Poltorak
- Succeeded by: Andriy Taran

Personal details
- Born: 5 December 1976 (age 49) Kyiv, Ukrainian SSR, Soviet Union (now Ukraine)
- Education: •Taras Shevchenko National University of Kyiv •University of Warwick •Saïd Business School • University of Oxford
- Occupation: Politician

Andrii Pavlovych Zahorodniuk (Ukrainian: Андрій Павлович Загороднюк; born 5 December 1976) is a Ukrainian entrepreneur and politician. From 2015 to 2017, Zahorodniuk headed the Reform Project Office at the Ministry of Defence of Ukraine. He was the Minister of Defence of Ukraine from 29 August 2019 to 4 March 2020.

== Biography ==
Zahorodniuk studied law at the Taras Shevchenko National University of Kyiv. He also graduated from Warwick University and Oxford University.

From 2005 to 2015 Zahorodniuk was the CEO of “Discovery Drilling Equipment Company”.

From 2015 to 2017, Zahorodniuk headed the Reform Project Office at the Ministry of Defense of Ukraine. In 2018 he was a member of the Reform Project Office under the Ministry of Defense.

Zahorodniuk became an advisor to the President of Ukraine Volodymyr Zelenskyy after Zelenskyy was elected president in the 2019 Ukrainian presidential election.

On 9 July 2019, President Zelenskyy appointed Zahorodniuk to serve as a Member of the supervisory board at Ukroboronprom.

On 29 August 2019 Zahorodniuk was appointed Minister of Defence in the Honcharuk Government. On 4 March 2020 he was succeeded (in this post) by Andrii Taran.

After his resignation as Defence Minister, Zahorodniuk became the Chairman of the “Centre for Defense Strategies”. The CDS is a Ukrainian security think tank that is involved in security studies, defence policy research and advocacy.

== Family ==
In July 2020 the Central Election Commission of Ukraine recognised Zahorodniuk's wife Alina Sviderska as a new People's Deputy of Ukraine for Voice, after Svyatoslav Vakarchuk's mandate was prematurely terminated, but she refused to take this position so Vakarchuk in Parliament was replaced by Andriy Sharaskin.

== See also ==
- Honcharuk Government
