= Pavlivka, Khmilnyk Raion =

Rural locality in Vinnytsia Oblast, Ukraine

Pavlivka Павлівка
- Village
- Location in Vinnytsia Oblast
- Coordinates: 49°26′28″N 28°27′55″E
- Country: Ukraine
- Oblast: Vinnytsia Oblast
- Raion: Khmilnyk Raion
- Hromada: Kalynivka Hromada
- Time zone: UTC+2 (EET)
  - Summer (DST): UTC+3 (EEST)
- Postal code: 22436

Pavlivka (Ukrainian: Павлівка) is a village in Ukraine, Vinnytsia Oblast, Khmilnyk Raion, Kalynivka urban hromada.

== History ==
It was known in the XV century.

== People ==
- Vasyl Nikiforov (1954–2015), Ukrainian serviceman, military sniper aviator
