= Vasyl Nikiforov =

Ukrainian military aviator (1954–2015)

- Василь Нікіфоров
- Vasyl Nikiforov during the international maneuvers "Safe Sky" (2011)
- Born: Vasyl Semenovych Nikiforov; 4 August 1954; Pavlivka, Khmilnyk Raion, Vinnytsia Oblast
- Died: 7 March 2015 (aged 60); Vinnytsia
- Alma mater: Chernihiv Higher Military Aviation School of Pilots, Gagarin Air Force Academy, National Defense Academy of Ukraine
- Military career
- Allegiance: Ukraine
- Branch: Ukrainian Air Force
- Rank: Lieutenant general
- Conflicts: Russo-Ukrainian War
- Awards: Order of Bohdan Khmelnytskyi

Vasyl Semenovych Nikiforov (4 August 1954, Pavlivka, Khmilnyk Raion, Vinnytsia Oblast – 7 March 2015, Vinnytsia) was a Ukrainian serviceman and a lieutenant general. He was the Deputy Commander of the Air Force for Aviation – Chief of Aviation of the Air Force Command of the Armed Forces of Ukraine, a military sniper aviator. He accumulated over 3300 hours of flight time. He mentored Fedir Tyshchuk.

== Biography ==
Nikiforov graduated from the Chernihiv Higher Military Aviation School of Pilots (1975), the Gagarin Air Force Academy (1989) and the National Defense Academy of Ukraine (2008).

He held positions from a pilot of a fighter aviation regiment to the Deputy Commander of the Air Force for Aviation – Chief of Aviation of the Air Force Command of the Armed Forces of Ukraine. He was a member of the interdepartmental working group on improving the training of flight personnel, ensuring the proper level of technical condition and safety of state aviation aircraft.

In 2008, Vasyl Nikiforov flew Ukrainian President Viktor Yushchenko into the sky on a Su-27. He personally supervised the actions of Ukrainian aviation during the joint Ukrainian-American-Polish exercise "Safe Skies 2011" in Myrhorod. Since 2014, he fought in eastern Ukraine, became ill and after being examined in a military hospital, where he was diagnosed with cancer, was treated in Israel. On 7 March 2015 he died in the Vinnytsia Military Medical Clinical Center.

== Awards ==
- Order of Bohdan Khmelnytskyi, 1st (2015, posthumously), 2nd (2013) and 3rd (2009) class

== Honoring the memory ==
On 30 December 2015, President of Ukraine Petro Poroshenko, taking into account the special services to the Motherland of Lieutenant General Vasyl Nikiforov and taking into account the exemplary performance of tasks by the personnel, decided to name the 299th Tactical Aviation Brigade of the Air Force of Ukraine after Lieutenant General Vasyl Nikiforov.

On 10 February 2016, President of Ukraine Petro Poroshenko, in order to honor the memory of Lieutenant General Vasyl Nikiforov, taking into account his courage and heroism, unbreakable spirit in the struggle for an independent Ukrainian state and taking into account his high professionalism, exemplary performance of assigned tasks by the personnel of the 831st Guards Tactical Aviation Brigade of the Air Force of Ukraine, he decided to name the Su-27 aircraft (tail number 50) of the 831st Guards Tactical Aviation Brigade of the Air Force of Ukraine after Vasyl Nikiforov.

On 6 December 2016, a memorial plaque to Vasyl Nikiforov was unveiled at the secondary school No. 3 in Kalynivka.
