= Fedir Tyshchuk =

Ukrainian military aviator

- Федір Тищук
- Born: Fedir Kostiantynovych Tyshchuk; Znosychi, Rivne Oblast
- Military career
- Allegiance: Ukraine
- Branch: Ukrainian Air Force
- Rank: Colonel
- Unit: 831st Tactical Aviation Brigade

Fedir Kostiantynovych Tyshchuk (Ukrainian: Іван Костянтинович Тищук, born in Znosychi, Rivne Oblast) is a Ukrainian military pilot ace 1st class, Colonel of the Air Force of the 831st Tactical Aviation Brigade of the Armed Forces of Ukraine.

== Biography ==
As of 2004, Tyshchuk was the deputy commander of the 831st Tactical Aviation Brigade. He served as the head of the Southern Air Command. He is a member of the Ukrainian Falcons pilot group of the Ukrainian Air Force.

Tyshchuk took part in the Timișoara 2000 air show in Romania, where he demonstrated the highest professional skills and was called the "King of the Air Ball". In 2004, he won an air show in Slovakia. In the same year, he was recognized as the best pilot at the 11th SIAD International Aviation Festival. For the best aerial demonstration, Lieutenant Colonel Fedir Tyshchuk was awarded the main prize, a combat saber, by the governor of South Moravia, Stanislav Juranenko, and the Chief of the General Staff of the Czech Republic Army, Lieutenant General Pavel Štefka, presented him with a commemorative medal. He also had victories in Romania, Austria and Turkey.

He mastered 5 types of combat aircraft. In 2000–2004, he was recognized as the best pilot in Europe. Some of the world's best aerobatics were created only by Colonel Fedir Tyshchuk. He was the teacher of General Vasyl Nikiforov.

Tyshchuk holds departmental awards from the Ministry of Defense of Ukraine.
