= Vladyslav Rykov =

Ukrainian military pilot (1993–2024)

Vladyslav Rykov Владислав Риков
- Born: 7 June 1993; Luhansk Oblast, Ukraine
- Died: 7 February 2024 (aged 30); Kurakhove, Donetsk Oblast, Ukraine
- Military career
- Branch: Ukrainian Air Force
- Unit: 299th Tactical Aviation Brigade
- Conflicts: Russo-Ukrainian War; Russian invasion of Ukraine

Vladyslav Mykolaiovych Rykov (Ukrainian: Владислав Миколайович Риков; 7 June 1993 – 7 February 2024) was a Ukrainian military pilot of the 299th Tactical Aviation Brigade of the Ukrainian Air Force. He was killed in the Russian invasion of Ukraine. Awardee of the Order for Courage.

== Biography ==
During the Russian invasion of Ukraine, he served in the 299th Tactical Aviation Brigade and participated in 385 sorties.

Rykov died during a combat mission on 7 February 2024 he was shot down near Kurakhove in the Pokrovsk region.

== Awards ==
- First-degree Order for Courage (10 June 2022) for personal courage and selfless actions shown in the defense of the state sovereignty and territorial integrity of Ukraine, loyalty to the military oath.
- Second-degree Order for Courage (18 May 2022) for personal courage and selfless actions shown in the defense of the state sovereignty and territorial integrity of Ukraine, loyalty to the military oath.
- Third-degree Order for Courage (2 May 2022) for personal courage and selfless actions shown in the defense of the state sovereignty and territorial integrity of Ukraine, loyalty to the military oath.
