= Andriy Taran =

Ukrainian lieutenant general and politician

- Андрій Таран
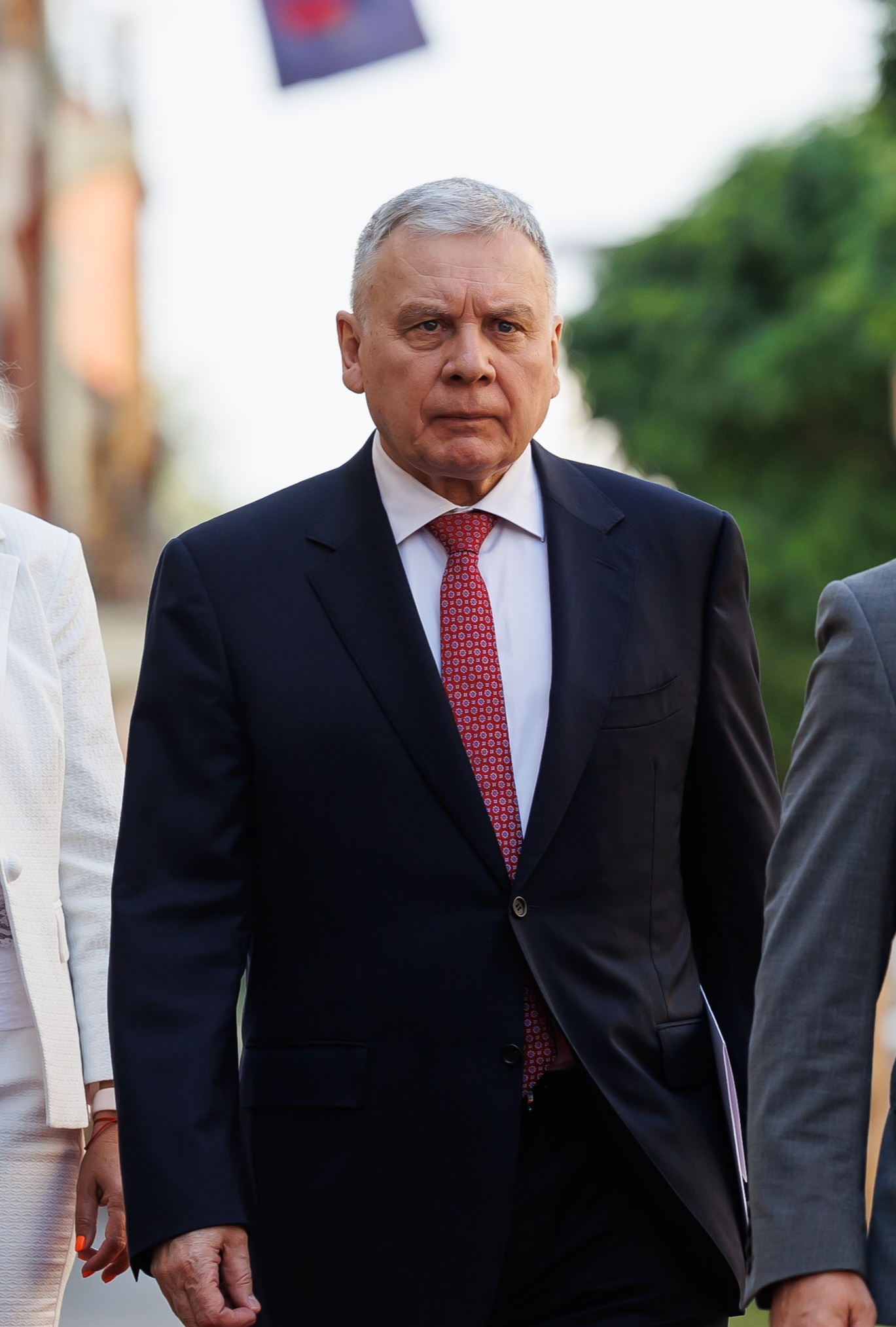
- Taran in 2022

16th Minister of Defence
- In office 4 March 2020 – 3 November 2021
- President: Volodymyr Zelenskyy
- Prime Minister: Denys Shmyhal
- Preceded by: Andriy Zahorodniuk
- Succeeded by: Oleksii Reznikov

First Deputy Commander of the Ground Forces
- In office December 2015 – April 2016

Ambassador of Ukraine to Slovenia
- In office 4 May 2022 – 21 December 2024
- President: Volodymyr Zelenskyy
- Preceded by: Mykhailo Brodovych

Personal details
- Born: 4 March 1955 (age 71) Frankfurt an der Oder, Brandenburg, East Germany (now Germany)
- Party: Strength and Honor
- Education: Kyiv Higher Engineer School of Artillery; National Defence University
- Occupation: Lieutenant general (retired); Politician

Military service
- Allegiance: Soviet Union; Ukraine
- Branch/service: Armed Forces of Ukraine
- Years of service: 1972–2016
- Rank: Lieutenant general

Andriy Vasylyovych Taran (Ukrainian: Андрій Васильович Таран; born 4 March 1955) is a Ukrainian politician who last served as Ukraine's ambassador to Slovenia from 2022 to 2024. He was the 16th Minister of Defence of Ukraine and before that a lieutenant general in the Ukrainian Armed Forces.

== Early life and education ==
Andriy Vasylyovych Taran was born 4 March 1955 in the East Germanу city of Frankfurt an der Oder to a military family serving in the Soviet Army's Group of Soviet Forces in Germany. In the 1970s, he graduated from the Kyiv Higher Engineer School of Artillery (now the Ivan Chernyakhovsky National Defence University of Ukraine) specializing in military radio engineering. In the 1980s he graduated from the Air Defence Army Academy in Kyiv with a major in combat management. He also underwent studies at the Taras Shevchenko National University of Kyiv and the National Defence University in Washington. He is fluent in English and Russian as second languages.

== Military and diplomatic service ==
In the early 90s, he served in the central office of the Ministry of Defence of Ukraine and then went to the Chief Directorate of Intelligence. He worked at the National Security and Defence Council of Ukraine as an expert in the Centre for Strategic Planning and Analysis, then returned to the central office of the Ministry of Defence in 1996. After leaving the Defence Ministry in 1999, he became a military attaché at the Embassy of Ukraine, Washington, D.C. From 2008, he was the Deputy Head of the Defence Intelligence of Ukraine. For five months ending in April 2016, he was the First Deputy Commander of the Armed Forces. In 2016, he retired at the age of 61 due to his age, holding the rank of lieutenant general. From September to November 2015, he worked in the Trilateral Contact Group on Ukraine.

== Political activity ==
In 2019, he headed the election headquarters of presidential candidate and former Head of the Security Service of Ukraine Ihor Smeshko. In the 2019 parliamentary elections, he ran for parliament with Smeshko's Strength and Honour party. But in the election the party won 3.82% of the votes, not enough to clear the 5% election threshold and it thus gained no parliamentary seats.

=== Defence minister ===
On his 65th birthday in 2020, he was personally appointed to the post of Minister of Defence by President Volodymyr Zelenskyy, serving in the Shmyhal Government. His appointment was backed by 285 MPs in the Verkhovna Rada.

On 13 March 2020, he became a member of the National Security and Defence Council of Ukraine.

On 14 December 2020, for the first time in the history of the Ministry of Defence of Ukraine, Taran signed several direct contracts with Turkish companies on technology transfer and production of corvettes and combat UAVs for the needs of the Ukrainian Armed Forces.

On 2 November 2021 Taran resigned as minister, reportedly for health reasons.

== Ambassador to Slovenia ==
On 5 May 2022, Taran was appointed Ukraine's ambassador to Slovenia.

On 21 December 2024, Taran was dismissed as Ukraine's ambassador to Slovenia.
