= Ivan Kozhedub National University of the Air Force =

Public university in Kharkiv, Ukraine

Ivan Kozhedub Kharkiv National Air Force University
- Харківський Національний Університет Повітряних Сил імені Івана Кожедуба
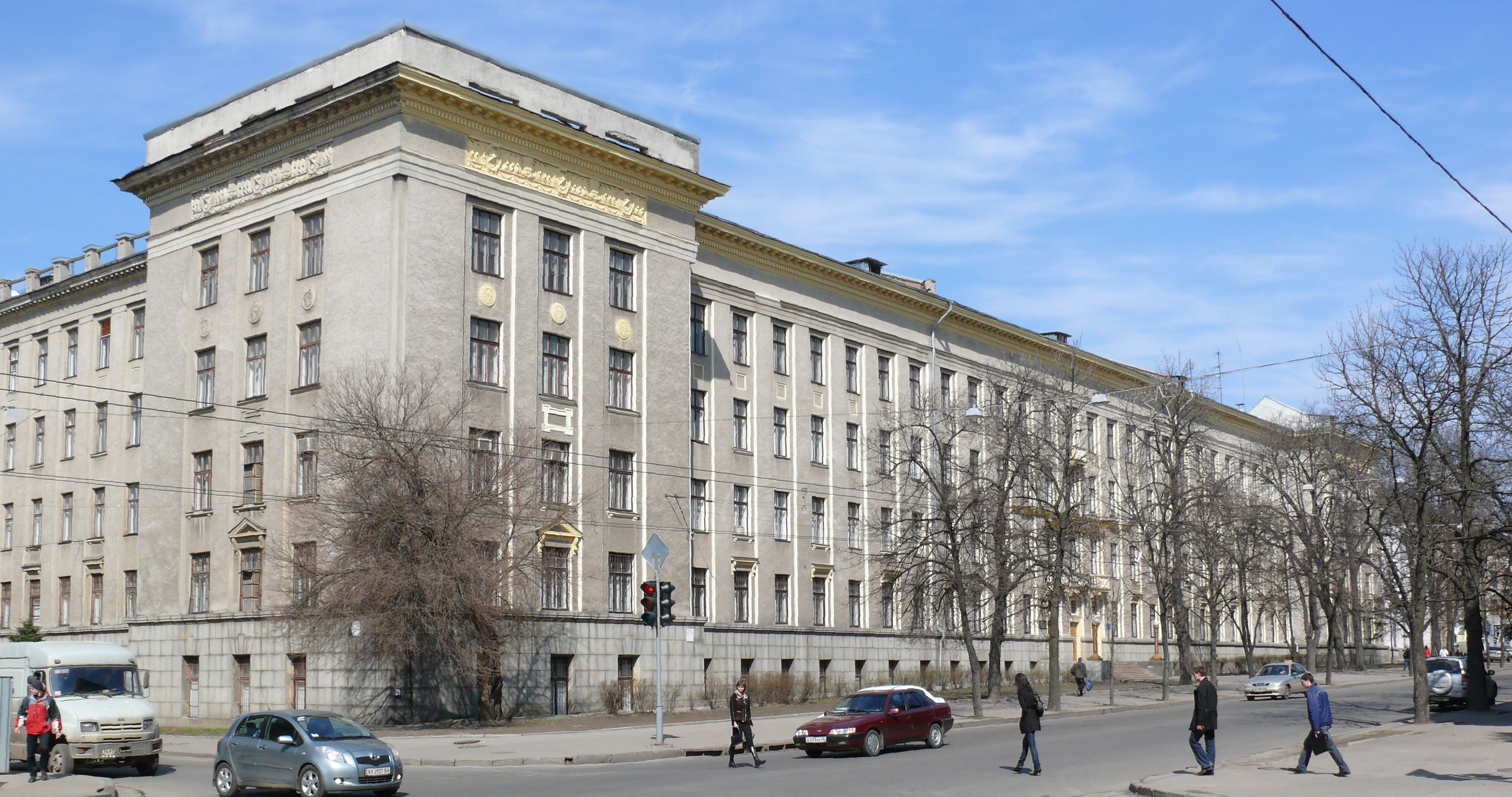
- Type: Public university
- Established: 2003
- Accreditation: Ministry of Education and Science of Ukraine
- Location: vulytsia Sumska, 77, Kharkiv, Ukraine
- Campus: Urban
- Website: www.hups.mil.gov.ua
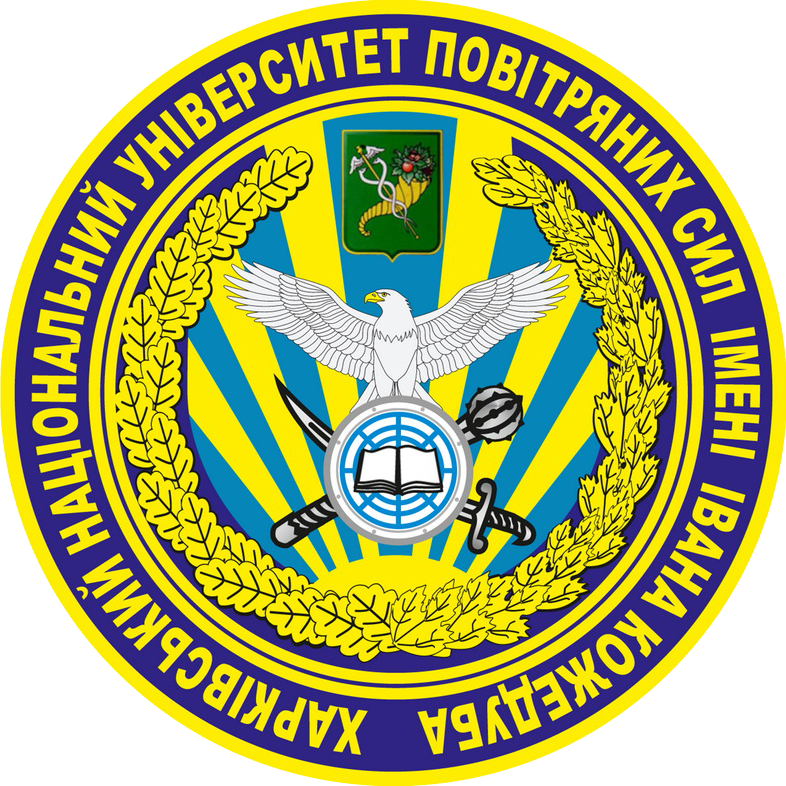

The Ivan Kozhedub Kharkiv National Air Force University (KNAFU; Ukrainian: Харківський національний університет Повітряних сил (ХНУПС) імені Івана Кожедуба, romanized: Kharkivskyi natsionalnyi universytet Povitrianykh syl (KhNUPS) imeni Ivana Kozheduba) is a public university administered by the Ministry of Defence of Ukraine and is located in the city of Kharkiv. The university is named in honor of the Soviet and Ukrainian military pilot Ivan Kozhedub.

== History ==
=== Soviet era ===
KNAFU is a descendant of two military academies and other nine military higher schools:

Kharkiv

- Gritsevets Military Aviation Higher School of Pilots (1930–1993)
- Lenin Komsomol Military Aviation Radioelectrionical Higher School (1937–1993)
- Govorov Military Engineer Radiotechnical Air Defense Academy (1941–1993)
- Krylov Military Command-Engineer Higher School of the Strategic Missile Forces (1941–1993)
- Kharkiv Military Aviation Engineer Superior School (1941–1993)

Poltava

- Vatutin Military Air Defense Missile Command Superior School (1941–1995)

Chernihiv

- Leninsky Komsomol Military Aviation Pilots Superior School (1941–1995)

Kyiv

- Vasilevsky Military Academy of the Army Air Defense Corps (1947–1994, see Ivan Chernyakhovsky National Defense University of Ukraine)
- Kirov Military Air Defense Missile Engineering Higher School (1937–1994)
- Kyiv Air Force Institute (1951–2000)

Luhansk

- Donbas Proletariat Military Aviation Navigators Higher School (1966–1994)

=== Namesake ===
After graduating from the Chuguiv Military Aviation Pilots School in 1941, Kozhedub was appointed a pilot instructor. From March 1943 Kozhedub served as an air force fighter pilot with the Soviet Air Forces. During the war, he made 330 sorties, led 120 air battles as a unit commander, and personally shot down 62 enemy aircraft. According to the ratio of air battles and enemy planes shot down in them, he was recognized as the most effective pilot of the Second World War's Eastern Front, winning three Gold Medals as a Hero of the Soviet Union. After the war, Kozhedub held a number of senior positions in the Soviet Armed Forces.

In different years the military institutions which became part of the KNUAF were named after prominent commanders LO Govorov, MI Krylov, OM Vasilevsky and SI Gritsevets.

=== Contribution to outer space ===
Within the walls of the university mastered the basics of flying and received a ticket to the sky 27 astronauts. The first detachment of astronauts included graduate A.A.Leonov – achieved the Hero of the Soviet Union twice, the first person to go into outer space. P.I.Klimuk, a graduate of the university, headed the astronaut training center for a long time. Awarded the Star of the Hero of Ukraine – the first cosmonaut of independent Ukraine – Major General L.K.Kadenyuk and Test Pilot Colonel O.V.Galunenko.

=== Post-independence ===
KNAFU was created on 10 September 2003 on the basis of both the Kharkiv National Air Force Institute and Kharkiv Military University.

In 2020 KNAFU was recognized by the NATO DEEP programme as one of 12 educational establishments participants in Ukraine.

On 20 January 2020, on the 5th anniversary of the Second Battle of Donetsk Airport, a combined military band including the university band performed at Kharkiv International Airport in honor of the forces that took part in the battle. It is led by Major Konstantin Streletsky.

On 25 September 2020, an An-26 military plane with 20 cadets and 7 officers of KNAFU crashed and immediately caught fire in Chuhuiv, Ukraine in Kharkiv Oblast. 26 people were killed and one seriously injured.

On 1 March 2022 the KNAFU building was destroyed by the Russians, on Day seven of the 2022 Russian invasion of Ukraine. They killed 14 military cadets and seven civilians, including two young children. The building appears to have been shelled, not bombed.

== University faculties ==
The total area of educational and laboratory premises of the university is more than 100 thousand square meters. Training sessions are held in classrooms equipped with computers, simulators and working models of weapons. The laboratories of the departments use modern laboratory facilities that allow to conduct research necessary to understand the principles of modern armaments and military equipment. There are 20 computer classes for students, cadets and students, which provide access to the World Wide Web.

To provide cadets and students with practical skills in the specialty, the university has: an aviation training brigade with a training complex for the training of air defense specialists; training ground; training complex of aviation simulators; educational and training complexes of faculties and departments; sports complex. The university has a unique library, which is one of the best libraries of public educational institutions. Its scientific and technical fund includes more than 1.3 million publications. In 2007–2008, the university developed an electronic library to support the educational process, which contains 4088 units of educational and methodological publications.

- Flight Faculty
- Engineering and Aviation Faculty
- Faculty of Air Defense of Ground Forces
- Faculty of Anti-Aircraft Missile Forces
- Faculty of Automated Control Systems and Ground Support of Aviation Flights
- Faculty of Radio-Technical Air Defense Forces
- Faculty of Information and Technical Systems
- Faculty of Postgraduate Education
- College of NCOs
- Faculty of Training Reserve Officers

The KNAFU reports to 203 training air brigades located in Chuguev, Kharkiv region. The equipped crews are L-39, An-26, An-26Sh.

The university trains qualified specialists in 9 areas and 18 specialties for the Armed Forces of Ukraine.

== Leadership ==
As of June 2024:

- Brigadier General Andrii Oleksandrovych BEREZHNY

== Famous graduates ==
Graduates of the university took part in peacekeeping operations in different parts of the world, eliminated the consequences of the Chernobyl tragedy, carried out combat duty, guarded the airspace of the state, held in their hands a missile shield of the Motherland. Over its long history, KNUAF has trained and graduated more than 125,000 officers.

Among the graduates of the university are 578 Heroes of the Soviet Union, 28 twice Heroes of the Soviet Union, as well as astronauts twice Hero of the Soviet Union Oleksiy Arkhipovych Leonov, Hero of Ukraine Leonid Konstantinovich Kadenyuk. Its namesake, Chief Marshal Ivan Kozhedub, became a Hero three times.

The German-Soviet war provided a powerful impetus for the further development of aviation, air defense, missile forces, and artillery. Military educational institutions were faced with the task of training highly qualified military specialists capable of handling new types of weapons. New faculties and departments were created. The number of specialties for training commanders, pilots, and military engineers has significantly increased. On the basis of basic scientific research in the field of aviation technology, radar theory, participation in the development and improvement of missiles, aviation, anti-aircraft missile, and electronic weapons of armies at faculties and departments were formed scientific and pedagogical teams capable of independent training. The material and technical base of scientific work and training has significantly strengthened.

In different years, the following famous graduates studied at the university:

- Colonel-General Kostyantyn Morozov – a graduate of 1967 – the first Minister of Defense of Ukraine (1991–1993);
- Major General of Aviation Kostash Ion Grigore – a graduate of 1967 – Minister of Defense of Moldova (1991–1992);
- Hrytsenko Anatoliy Stepanovych – a graduate of 1979 – Minister of Defense of Ukraine (2005–2007).
- Savchenko Nadiya Viktorivna – 2009 graduate – senior lieutenant, navigator-operator of Mi-24 helicopter, Participant in the peacekeeping operation in Iraq, Participant in the anti-terrorist operation in eastern Ukraine.
- Zamyatin Vadym Ivanovych (1935–2006) – Doctor of Technical Sciences, Professor, Honored Worker of Science and Technology of the USSR.
- Kondratenko Alexander Pavlovich (* 1945) – Doctor of Technical Sciences, Professor, Retired Colonel.
- Loshakov Valery Andreevich (* 1946) – Doctor of Technical Sciences, Professor.
- Mulik Vasyl Leontiyovych – People's Hero of Ukraine, participant in the war in eastern Ukraine and peacekeeping operations in Africa.
- Voloshin Vladyslav Valeriyovych – a graduate of 2010 – People's Hero of Ukraine, a participant in the war in eastern Ukraine.

Among the university graduates are commanders-in-chief and deputy commanders-in-chief of the Armed Forces, commanders of armies and corps, division commanders, 407 generals, members of academies of sciences, State Prize winners, doctors, and candidates of science, honored scientists, education and higher education.

== Awards ==
The high authority of the university is evidenced by the fact that over the past decade it has been recognized 5 times the best rated educational institution in Ukraine with the award of a bronze statuette "Sophia of Kyiv".

== See also ==
List of universities in Ukraine
