= Matveyevsky (rural locality) =

Matveyevsky (Russian: Матвеевский; masculine), Matveyevskaya (Матвеевская; feminine), or Matveyevskoye (Матвеевское; neuter) is the name of several rural localities in Russia.

== Arkhangelsk Oblast ==
As of 2010, five rural localities in Arkhangelsk Oblast bear this name:

- Matveyevskaya, Kholmogorsky District, Arkhangelsk Oblast, a village in Kekhotsky Selsoviet of Kholmogorsky District
- Matveyevskaya, Konoshsky District, Arkhangelsk Oblast, a village in Yertsevsky Selsoviet of Konoshsky District
- Matveyevskaya, Plesetsky District, Arkhangelsk Oblast, a village in Yarnemsky Selsoviet of Plesetsky District
- Matveyevskaya, Ustyansky District, Arkhangelsk Oblast, a village in Rostovsky Selsoviet of Ustyansky District
- Matveyevskaya, Vilegodsky District, Arkhangelsk Oblast, a village in Ilyinsky Selsoviet of Vilegodsky District

== Ivanovo Oblast ==
As of 2010, one rural locality in Ivanovo Oblast bears this name:

- Matveyevskaya, Ivanovo Oblast, a village in Yuryevetsky District

== Kabardino-Balkar Republic ==
As of 2010, one rural locality in the Kabardino-Balkar Republic bears this name:

- Matveyevsky, Kabardino-Balkar Republic, a khutor in Prokhladnensky District

== Kirov Oblast ==
As of 2010, two rural localities in Kirov Oblast bear this name:

- Matveyevskaya, Afanasyevsky District, Kirov Oblast, a village in Biserovsky Rural Okrug of Afanasyevsky District
- Matveyevskaya, Luzsky District, Kirov Oblast, a village under the administrative jurisdiction of the Town of Luza in Luzsky District

== Komi Republic ==
As of 2010, one rural locality in the Komi Republic bears this name:

- Matveyevskaya, Komi Republic, a village in Loyma Selo Administrative Territory of Priluzsky District

== Kostroma Oblast ==
As of 2010, two rural localities in Kostroma Oblast bear this name:

- Matveyevskoye, Galichsky District, Kostroma Oblast, a village in Orekhovskoye Settlement of Galichsky District
- Matveyevskoye, Sharyinsky District, Kostroma Oblast, a selo in Golovinskoye Settlement of Sharyinsky District

== Moscow Oblast ==
As of 2010, one rural locality in Moscow Oblast bears this name:

- Matveyevskoye, Moscow Oblast, a village in Lagovskoye Rural Settlement of Podolsky District

== Nizhny Novgorod Oblast ==
As of 2010, one rural locality in Nizhny Novgorod Oblast bears this name:

- Matveyevskoye, Nizhny Novgorod Oblast, a village in Berezyatsky Selsoviet of Tonshayevsky District

== Rostov Oblast ==
As of 2010, one rural locality in Rostov Oblast bears this name:

- Matveyevsky, Rostov Oblast, a khutor in Kalininskoye Rural Settlement of Sholokhovsky District

== Ryazan Oblast ==
As of 2010, one rural locality in Ryazan Oblast bears this name:

- Matveyevskoye, Ryazan Oblast, a selo in Pridorozhny Rural Okrug of Sasovsky District

== Tver Oblast ==
As of 2010, three rural localities in Tver Oblast bear this name:

- Matveyevskoye, Kalininsky District, Tver Oblast, a village in Kalininsky District
- Matveyevskoye (selo), Kesovogorsky District, Tver Oblast, a selo in Kesovogorsky District
- Matveyevskoye (village), Kesovogorsky District, Tver Oblast, a village in Kesovogorsky District

== Vologda Oblast ==
As of 2010, twelve rural localities in Vologda Oblast bear this name:

- Matveyevskoye, Kirillovsky District, Vologda Oblast, a village in Nikolo-Torzhsky Selsoviet of Kirillovsky District
- Matveyevskoye, Sheksninsky District, Vologda Oblast, a village in Yeremeyevsky Selsoviet of Sheksninsky District
- Matveyevskoye, Kubensky Selsoviet, Vologodsky District, Vologda Oblast, a village in Kubensky Selsoviet of Vologodsky District
- Matveyevskoye, Markovsky Selsoviet, Vologodsky District, Vologda Oblast, a village in Markovsky Selsoviet of Vologodsky District
- Matveyevskoye, Nefedovsky Selsoviet, Vologodsky District, Vologda Oblast, a village in Nefedovsky Selsoviet of Vologodsky District
- Matveyevskaya, Nyuksensky District, Vologda Oblast, a village in Kosmarevsky Selsoviet of Nyuksensky District
- Matveyevskaya, Tarnogsky District, Vologda Oblast, a village in Shevdenitsky Selsoviet of Tarnogsky District
- Matveyevskaya, Vashkinsky District, Vologda Oblast, a village in Ivanovsky Selsoviet of Vashkinsky District
- Matveyevskaya, Sibirsky Selsoviet, Verkhovazhsky District, Vologda Oblast, a village in Sibirsky Selsoviet of Verkhovazhsky District
- Matveyevskaya, Verkhnetermengsky Selsoviet, Verkhovazhsky District, Vologda Oblast, a village in Verkhnetermengsky Selsoviet of Verkhovazhsky District
- Matveyevskaya, Verkhovsky Selsoviet, Verkhovazhsky District, Vologda Oblast, a village in Verkhovsky Selsoviet of Verkhovazhsky District
- Matveyevskaya, Vozhegodsky District, Vologda Oblast, a village in Mishutinsky Selsoviet of Vozhegodsky District

== Yaroslavl Oblast ==
As of 2010, two rural localities in Yaroslavl Oblast bear this name:

- Matveyevskoye, Rostovsky District, Yaroslavl Oblast, a selo in Nikolsky Rural Okrug of Rostovsky District
- Matveyevskoye, Yaroslavsky District, Yaroslavl Oblast, a village in Bekrenevsky Rural Okrug of Yaroslavsky District
