= Battle of Korsuń =

1648 battle during the Khmelnytsky Uprising

Coordinates: 49.4361°N 31.1703°E

- Part of the Khmelnytsky Uprising
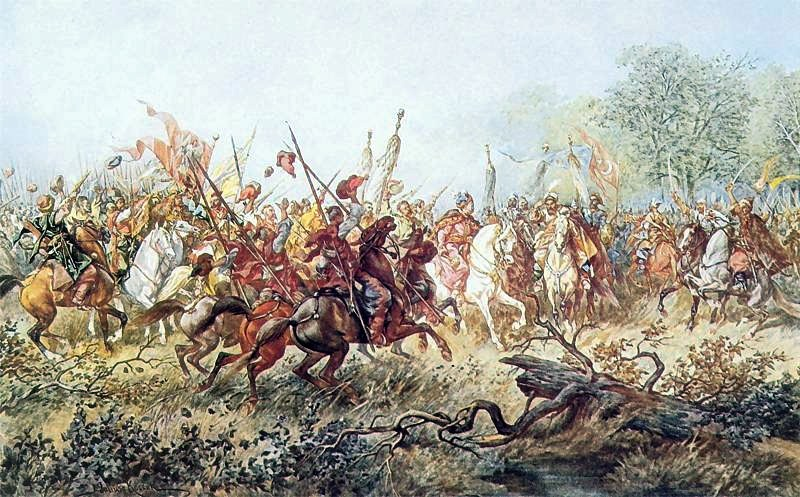
- Meeting of Bohdan Khmelnytsky with Tugay Bey in Korsuń. Painting by Juliusz Kossak in 1885
Date	25–26 May 1648
Location	Korsuń, Kyiv Voivodeship, Polish–Lithuanian Commonwealth
Result	Cossack–Tatar victory

Belligerents
Zaporozhian Host; Crimean Khanate	Polish–Lithuanian Commonwealth

Commanders and leaders
Bohdan Khmelnytsky; Mykhailo Krychevsky; Ivan Bohun; Ivan Sirko; Maksym Kryvonis; Danylo Nechai; Martyn Pushkar; Matviy Hladky; Mykhailo Hromyka; Tugay Bey	Mikołaj Potocki (POW); Marcin Kalinowski (POW)

Strength
15,000–20,000 Cossacks and rebels 3,000 Tatars; 26 cannons	4,000–20,000; 41 cannons

Casualties and losses
Light	500 killed, 95% of the Army taken prisoner Most killed 8,500 captured All cannons captured

The Battle of Korsuń (Ukrainian: Битва під Корсунем, Корсунська битва, Polish: Bitwa pod Korsuniem, Korsuńska bitwa; 25–26 May 1648) was the second significant battle of the Khmelnytsky Uprising. Near the site of the present-day city of Korsun-Shevchenkivskyi in Ukraine, forces of the Zaporozhian Host and Crimean Khanate under the command of Hetman Bohdan Khmelnytsky, Colonels Mykhailo Krychevsky, Ivan Bohun, Maksym Kryvonis, Martyn Pushkar, Matviy Hladky and Mykhailo Hromyka with Tugay Bey attacked and defeated the Polish–Lithuanian Commonwealth’s forces under the command of Hetmans Mikołaj Potocki and Marcin Kalinowski, capturing both men. As in the Battle of Zhovti Vody in 29 April — 16 May 1648 the Polish–Lithuanian Commonwealth’s forces took a defensive position, retreated and were thoroughly routed and destroyed by the forces of the Zaporozhian Host and Crimean Khanate.

== Background ==
On 16 May 1648, Bohdan Khmelnytsky's forces overwhelmed and defeated Commonwealth’s forces under the command of Stefan Potocki at the Battle of Zhovti Vody. Stefan's father, Grand Crown Hetman Mikołaj Potocki, was unable to send reinforcements in time to relieve him; however, with the number of defections from the force that was sent to fight Khmelnytsky (over 5,000 registered Cossacks switched their allegiance), it is doubtful that the reinforcements could have helped defeat the combined Cossack and Tatar army of 18,000. From his fortified position beyond Chyhyryn, fifteen miles from Zhovti Vody, Mikołaj Potocki signaled a retreat on 13 May to the north. Near Cherkasy, the lone survivor from the battle at Zhovti Vody reached Potocki on 19 May with news of the disastrous defeat. Two days later, in 21 May, Potocki had only made it as far as the present-day city of Korsun-Shevchenkivskyi when he decided to wait for Jeremi Wiśniowiecki's army of 6,000 Poles.

Other sources put Cossack and rebel forces at 15,000–20,000 with 26 cannons, supported by Crimean Tatars. Polish-Lithuanian army is believed to have consisted of 5,500 cavalry, 1,600 infantry and had 41 cannons. In total, 20,000 when nobles, servants and squires are included on Polish-Lithuanian side. With combined forces of about 5,000 men, Field Crown Hetman Marcin Kalinowski and Great Crown Hetman Mikołaj Potocki with 15,000 infantry awaited Khmelnytsky's advance parties who were soon seen crossing the Tiasmyn River. Soon they were crossing the Ros River into Korsun, so Potocki ordered Korsun burned and placed his army in front of his camp where he skirmished with the Crimean Tatars. Then the Zaporozhian Cossacks started to dam the river at Stebliv. During a council of war, given the superior forces of the enemy, Potocki decided to retreat along the road to Bohuslav in corral formation the next day.

== Battle ==
The retreat started at dawn, during which the Cossack and Tatar armies allowed Potocki's forces to pass until they reached Horokhova Dibrova, about a mile and a half from Korsun, at noon. This proved to be disastrous, as Bohdan Khmelnytsky had ordered his First Polkovnyk (Colonel) Maksym Kryvonis (aka "Crooked-nose" or Perebyinis) to prepare a trap in this "swampy valley between two precipices", including trenches and a barricaded road. The resulting chaos as the Commonwealth's forces entered an impenetrable valley allowed Khmelnytsky's forces to flank them from both sides, quickly slaughtering whole divisions. Only about 1,500 of the Commonwealth’s forces (under a Colonel Korycki) managed to escape. Both Hetmans were taken prisoner, and the rest of the army was either captured or killed.

== Aftermath ==
Over 8,500 Polish-Lithuanian troops, 41 cannons and a train were captured, with the rest of the troops killed and only 1,500 managing to flee. The Polish–Lithuanian Commonwealth was left without military commanders, and Bohdan Khmelnytsky continued his uprising, marshaling his forces towards Bila Tserkva.

== Bibliography ==
- Paly, Alexander (2017). Історія України [History of Ukraine] (in Ukrainian). Vol. 3. Kyiv: К.І.С. ISBN 978-617-684-166-1.
