= Matveyevka =

Matveyevka (Russian: Матвеевка) is the name of several rural localities in Russia.

== Altai Krai ==
As of 2010, one rural locality in Altai Krai bears this name:

- Matveyevka, Altai Krai, a selo in Tumanovsky Selsoviet of Soloneshensky District

== Republic of Bashkortostan ==
As of 2010, one rural locality in the Republic of Bashkortostan bears this name:

- Matveyevka, Republic of Bashkortostan, a village in Pervomaysky Selsoviet of Sterlitamaksky District

== Kaliningrad Oblast ==
As of 2010, one rural locality in Kaliningrad Oblast bears this name:

- Matveyevka, Kaliningrad Oblast, a settlement in Nizovsky Rural Okrug of Guryevsky District

== Khabarovsk Krai ==
As of 2010, one rural locality in Khabarovsk Krai bears this name:

- Matveyevka, Khabarovsk Krai, a selo of Khabarovsky District

== Kirov Oblast ==
As of 2010, one rural locality in Kirov Oblast bears this name:

- Matveyevka, Kirov Oblast, a village in Zimnyaksky Rural Okrug of Kilmezsky District

== Kostroma Oblast ==
As of 2010, one rural locality in Kostroma Oblast bears this name:

- Matveyevka, Kostroma Oblast, a village in Shangskoye Settlement of Sharyinsky District

== Krasnoyarsk Krai ==
As of 2010, two rural localities in Krasnoyarsk Krai bear this name:

- Matveyevka, Abansky District, Krasnoyarsk Krai, a village in Nikolsky Selsoviet of Abansky District
- Matveyevka, Kazachinsky District, Krasnoyarsk Krai, a village in Vorokovsky Selsoviet of Kazachinsky District

== Kurgan Oblast ==
As of 2010, one rural locality in Kurgan Oblast bears this name:

- Matveyevka, Kurgan Oblast, a selo in Matveyevsky Selsoviet of Tselinny District

== Kursk Oblast ==
As of 2010, eight rural localities in Kursk Oblast bear this name:

- Matveyevka, Kastorensky District, Kursk Oblast, a village in Zhernovetsky Selsoviet of Kastorensky District
- Matveyevka, Konyshyovsky District, Kursk Oblast, a village in Mashkinsky Selsoviet of Konyshyovsky District
- Matveyevka, Korenevsky District, Kursk Oblast, a village in Korenevsky Selsoviet of Korenevsky District
- Matveyevka, Ponyrovsky District, Kursk Oblast, a village in Nizhnesmorodinsky Selsoviet of Ponyrovsky District
- Matveyevka, Ozersky Selsoviet, Shchigrovsky District, Kursk Oblast, a village in Ozersky Selsoviet of Shchigrovsky District
- Matveyevka, Znamensky Selsoviet, Shchigrovsky District, Kursk Oblast, a village in Znamensky Selsoviet of Shchigrovsky District
- Matveyevka, Donskoy Selsoviet, Zolotukhinsky District, Kursk Oblast, a village in Donskoy Selsoviet of Zolotukhinsky District
- Matveyevka, Sedmikhovsky Selsoviet, Zolotukhinsky District, Kursk Oblast, a village in Sedmikhovsky Selsoviet of Zolotukhinsky District

== Lipetsk Oblast ==
As of 2010, two rural localities in Lipetsk Oblast bear this name:

- Matveyevka, Dobrinsky District, Lipetsk Oblast, a village in Bereznegovatsky Selsoviet of Dobrinsky District
- Matveyevka, Izmalkovsky District, Lipetsk Oblast, a village in Afanasyevsky Selsoviet of Izmalkovsky District

== Moscow Oblast ==
As of 2010, one rural locality in Moscow Oblast bears this name:

- Matveyevka, Moscow Oblast, a village in Gazoprovodskoye Rural Settlement of Lukhovitsky District

== Nizhny Novgorod Oblast ==
As of 2010, one rural locality in Nizhny Novgorod Oblast bears this name:

- Matveyevka, Nizhny Novgorod Oblast, a village in Redkinsky Selsoviet of the city of oblast significance of Bor

== Novosibirsk Oblast ==
As of 2010, one rural locality in Novosibirsk Oblast bears this name:

- Matveyevka, Novosibirsk Oblast, a village in Chanovsky District

== Orenburg Oblast ==
As of 2010, two rural localities in Orenburg Oblast bear this name:

- Matveyevka, Matveyevsky District, Orenburg Oblast, a selo in Matveyevsky Selsoviet of Matveyevsky District
- Matveyevka, Sorochinsky District, Orenburg Oblast, a selo in Matveyevsky Selsoviet of Sorochinsky District

== Oryol Oblast ==
As of 2010, one rural locality in Oryol Oblast bears this name:

- Matveyevka, Oryol Oblast, a village in Dubrovsky Selsoviet of Dolzhansky District

== Ryazan Oblast ==
As of 2010, two rural localities in Ryazan Oblast bear this name:

- Matveyevka, Ryazansky District, Ryazan Oblast, a village in Vyshetravinsky Rural Okrug of Ryazansky District
- Matveyevka, Starozhilovsky District, Ryazan Oblast, a village under the administrative jurisdiction of the work settlement of Starozhilovo in Starozhilovsky District

== Saratov Oblast ==
As of 2010, two rural localities in Saratov Oblast bear this name:

- Matveyevka, Balakovsky District, Saratov Oblast, a selo in Balakovsky District
- Matveyevka, Dergachyovsky District, Saratov Oblast, a settlement in Dergachyovsky District

== Tambov Oblast ==
As of 2010, one rural locality in Tambov Oblast bears this name:

- Matveyevka, Tambov Oblast, a village in Pokrovo-Marfinsky Selsoviet of Znamensky District

== Tula Oblast ==
As of 2010, one rural locality in Tula Oblast bears this name:

- Matveyevka, Tula Oblast, a village in Vasilyevsky Rural Okrug of Venyovsky District

== Tver Oblast ==
As of 2010, one rural locality in Tver Oblast bears this name:

- Matveyevka, Tver Oblast, a village in Kimrsky District

== Ulyanovsk Oblast ==
As of 2010, one rural locality in Ulyanovsk Oblast bears this name:

- Matveyevka, Ulyanovsk Oblast, a selo in Matveyevsky Rural Okrug of Staromaynsky District

== Vladimir Oblast ==
As of 2010, one rural locality in Vladimir Oblast bears this name:

- Matveyevka, Vladimir Oblast, a village in Selivanovsky District

== Yaroslavl Oblast ==
As of 2010, two rural localities in Yaroslavl Oblast bear this name:

- Matveyevka, Pereslavsky District, Yaroslavl Oblast, a village in Zagoryevsky Rural Okrug of Pereslavsky District
- Matveyevka, Uglichsky District, Yaroslavl Oblast, a village in Slobodskoy Rural Okrug of Uglichsky District

== See also ==
- Matviivka (disambiguation), a list of localities in Ukraine with the equivalent Ukrainian-language name
