= Battle of Zhovti Vody =

Battle fought in the Khmelnytsky Uprising

- Part of the Khmelnytsky Uprising
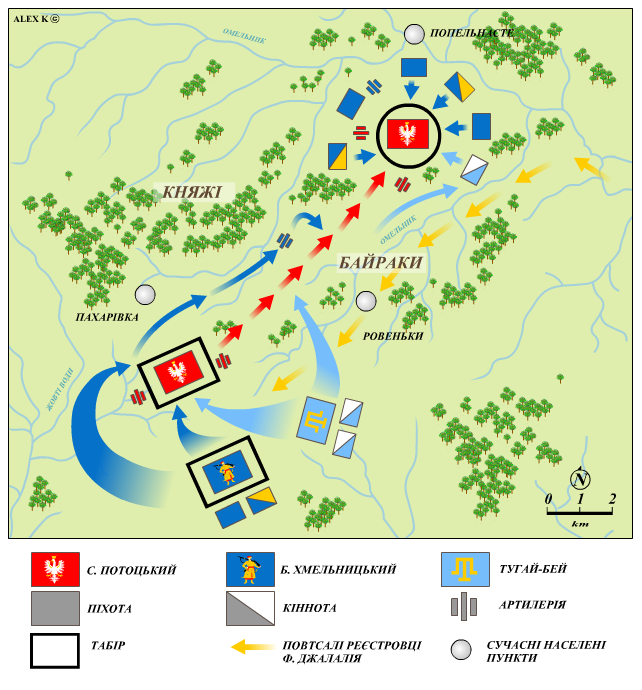
- Attack of the Zaporozhian Cossacks and Crimean Tatars on the Polish–Lithuanian Commonwealth
Date	29 April – 16 May 1648
Location	Zhovti Vody, Kyiv Voivodeship, Polish–Lithuanian Commonwealth
Result	Cossack–Tatar victory

Belligerents
Zaporozhian Host; Crimean Khanate	Polish–Lithuanian Commonwealth

Commanders and leaders
Bohdan Khmelnytsky; Maksym Kryvonis; Ivan Sirko; Fylon Dzhalaliy; Danylo Nechai; Tugay Bey	Stefan Potocki (POW); Stefan Czarniecki (POW); Mykhailo Krychevsky (D)

Strength
4,000–5,000 Cossacks; 3,000–4,000 Tatars	3,500–5,000

Casualties and losses
150 killed 150 wounded	300–3,000 captured

The Battle of Zhovti Vody or Yellow Waters (Ukrainian: Битва під Жовтими Водами; Polish: Bitwa pod Żołtymi Wodami; 29 April — 16 May 1648) was the first significant battle of the Khmelnytsky Uprising. Near the site of the present-day city of Zhovti Vody on the Zhovta River in Ukraine, the forces of the Zaporozhian Host and Crimean Khanate under the command of Hetman Bohdan Khmelnytsky, Colonels Mykhailo Krychevsky, Maksym Kryvonis, and Fylon Dzhalaliy with Tugay Bey attacked and defeated the Polish–Lithuanian Commonwealth's forces under the command of Hetman Stefan Potocki and General Stefan Czarniecki, both of them were captured in the battle by the Zaporozhian Cossacks and Crimean Tatars.

The events took place about 20 miles in north of the city of Zhovti Vody on the Zhovta River, which is now on the border between the Kirovohrad Oblast and Dnipropetrovsk Oblast in south–central Ukraine, where the Polish–Lithuanian Commonwealth's forces were attacked and defeated by the Zaporozhian Cossacks and Crimean Tatars. The Registered Cossacks, who were originally allied with the Crown Army, arrived and unexpectedly joined to the forces of the Zaporozhian Host and Crimean Khanate under the command of Hetman Bohdan Khmelnytsky and Khan İslâm III Giray, the Polish–Lithuanian Commonwealth's forces under the command of Hetman Stefan Potocki and General Stefan Czarniecki were annihilated while attempting to retreat in the 18-day battle, only days before reinforcements were to arrive.

== Events leading to the battle ==
=== Preparation for the war with the Ottomans ===
With the death of Hetman Stanisław Koniecpolski in March 1646, and without the knowledge of his successor Hetman Mikołaj Potocki, King Władysław IV Vasa established direct relations with the Cossacks, concerning the "wrongs and injustices that they were suffering".

In April 1646, after meeting with Cossack officers (starshyna), Władysław IV Vasa secretly chartered them to rally the Cossack's forces for the upcoming sea campaign against the Crimean Khanate, increased the size of the Zaporozhian Host to 12,000 and gave them 6,000 talers to equip "sixty well-armed boats". The king gave his letter to the Military Osavul Ivan Barabash. who headed the Cossack Diplomatic Mission to the royal court, Among other Cossack officers present was Bohdan Khmelnytsky, who at that time was a company commander of the Registered Cossacks Chyhyryn Regiment. Other members included another Yesaul, Ilyash Karaimovychm and regimental Yesaul Ivan Nestorenko.

Władysław picked Lviv as a rallying point for the campaign against the Crimean Tatars, stocking it with artillery, although that may have only been a rumor. These preparations led some to believe that the king was preparing for a takeover of government, and the Kraków Senate of July 1646 requested that he stop all preparations, intending to raise the issue at the upcoming session of the Polish Sejm (parliament). Being left without support from the parliament, Wladyslaw hoped that the Zaporozhian Cossacks, nonetheless, would be able to "obtain justice for themselves with their own forces".

Barabash and Karaimovych, after hearing that the king had lost his support in the Sejm, refused to follow his orders and go against the decision of the Polish Sejm. Hetman Bohdan Khmelnytsky decided to go forward with the king's directive. He was able to gain control over the king's letter and decided to take Cossack recruitment on himself. Barabash and Karaimovych informed the authorities about this development and the Chyhyryn starosta, Aleksander Koniecpolski set to supervise Khmelnytsky. His assistant Daniel Czapliński, enraged by a complaint Khmelnytsky had lodged against him, made a raid on the Khmelnytsky estate village of Subotiv in 1646, killing Khmelnytsky's younger son in the Chyhyryn market, seized Khmelnytsky's homestead, destroyed the manor, and confiscated "grain and all kinds of property".

At the beginning of May 1647, the next session of the Polish Sejm took place, where plans were made to discuss the king's drive to war. By the end of May, Bohdan Khmelnytsky, with an escort of ten other Cossacks, appeared in Warsaw. Officially his arrival could have been explained by his desire to seek justice in his case with Czapliński; however, in reality the goal of his appearance was much broader. Since 1646, the Sejm had seen remarkable changes taking place, and Khmelnytsky wanted to reassure himself of the King's stance on the war with the Turks. In case Wladyslaw was still planning to go forward, Khmelnytsky had intended to concentrate all the connections with the king and his supporters, as Barabash and Karaimovych sided with the opposition and refused material support to enable the king to realize his plans. Khmelnytsky also wanted to find out whether the Sejm would change its position regarding the war plans. In addition to all of that, Khmelnytsky and his comrades while visiting used that opportunity to study the situation in the region and gather all possible intelligence. Although this and other accounts of Khmelneytsky's visit to Warsaw are doubted by Hrushevsky, since Khmelnytsky could not have turned to the king while he was "a property holder without title", but Khmelnytsky did become the target of political maneuvering, including "accusations of treason and incitement of the Cossacks to revolt."

=== Khmelnytsky's conspiracy, arrest and bail ===
An important gathering took place in October 1647 near Chyhyryn, where Khmelnytsky reminded the public about the situation in the region, the intentions of the king of Poland to start a war against the Ottomans and how the Polish magnates counteracted those plans. He showed the king's letter that had been given to him, and at the end announced that it was a good time for an uprising while there were disagreements between the Poles. However, his audience was not eager to follow these proclamations, pointing to their shortage of arms, the size of the Polish armed forces and other factors. Responding to these arguments Khmelnytsky said that it would be a good idea to ally with an outside force such as the Muscovites or Tatars. However, historian Mykhailo Hrushevsky doubts Bohdan Khmelnytsky actually had the king's letter, viewing this account as "popular legend".

Sometime after the gathering Khmelnytsky was arrested in the village of Buzhyn, (30 kilometres (19 miles) north of Chyhyryn), by Radlinski, a servitor of Aleksander Koniecpolski, and was sent to Kryliv. Khmelnytsky was released on the bond of Mykhailo Krychevsky, who cautioned Khmelnytsky about a plot to kill him. "Having nowhere to turn for protection", Khmelnytsky "set out" for the Lower Dnipro River "to others who had been similarly mistreated". Khmelnytsky pretended that he was going with his escort (around 1,000 men, though some sources say 250) to Trakhtemyriv (administrative center of Registered Cossacks), but suddenly changed direction and moved towards the Zaporozhian Sich together with his older son Tymofii Khmelnytsky and 20 cavalrymen of his escort.

At that time, one of his friends, Fedir Liutai, a former Registered Cossack, was elected Kish Otaman. Khmelnytsky arrived to Zaporizhzhia sometime on 11 December 1647 (by some other sources 1 January 1648), where he was met by Liutai on Tomakivka island. At this time, on the neighboring island of Khortytsia there was a Polish garrison of the Cherkasy Cossack Regiment and a unit of dragoons headed by Col. Górski. Upon the arrival of Khmelnytsky and his men the preparations for the uprising went faster. Several envoys were sent to the Don Cossacks and to Bakhchysarai. However, in Crimea, Tatars were skeptical of the uprising intended by the Zaporozhian Cossacks, who were suppressed by "Ordination of 1638".

== Attack on Khortytsia and the organization of expedition ==
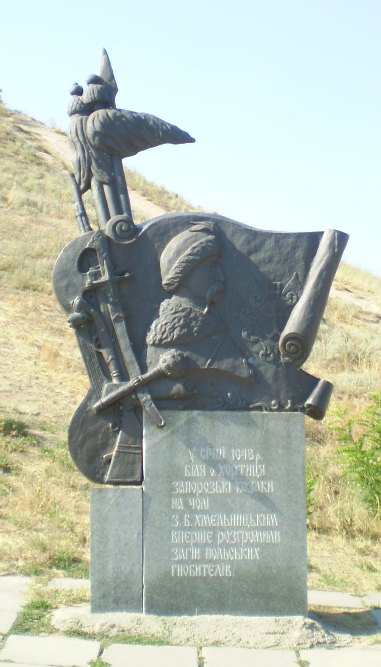
Writing on the monument says: "In January 1648 near is. Khortytsia the Zaporizhian Cossacks headed by B. Khmelnytsky for the first time defeated the force of Polish oppressors."

At the end of January, Bohdan Khmelnytsky led a surprise attack on the Khortytsia garrison. The bigger part of the registered Cossacks joined the mutineers, and Colonel Górski, after losing over 30 people, retreated to Kryliv. Commenting on this attack, Adam Kisiel mentioned to the Putivl voivode, Prince Dolgoruki "on 4 February 1648, Bohdan Khmelnytsky attacked the Sich, where the Cherkasy regiment was standing guard, seized all the provisions, and took all the boats."

After expelling the Polish garrison from the Zaporozhian Sich Khmelnytsky sent out several agitation letters to the local public calling them to rise up against Poles ("summon them to unruliness"). The letters were effective as more and more people were drawn to the Sich, numbering around 3,000 to 5,000 by the end of February 1648. During that time Cossacks continued to reinforce their fortifications on Butsk (Butska) Island.

On 15 March 1648, Bohdan Khmelnytsky, together with his son Tymofii Khmelnytsky and a small company, arrived at Bakhchysarai on a diplomatic mission. Hetman Bohdan Khmelnytsky presented to Khan İslâm III Giray the King's letter and proposed an alliance. After a few days of thinking Giray decided to send his mirza Tugay Bey on the expedition with Cossacks. After that Khmelnytsky returned to Sich, leaving his son with the Khan as "insurance". Upon arrival of Khmelnytsky, the Kish Otaman called for the General Council that was set for 19 April. Because of the number of people attending the council it took place just outside the Sich itself. At the gathering the Cossacks unanimously expressed their will for the war against Poles and an immediate expedition. Bohdan Khmelnytsky was solemnly elected the Hetman. During the ceremony the Kish Otaman passed down to the new hetman the banner, the standard, and the military drums – the Cossack Kleinody.

It was decided that only eight thousand Cossacks would go out of the Sich while the rest would stay put as reserves. During the preparations the envoy of the Crown Hetman Mikołaj Potocki, rotmistrz Chmielnicki arrived in the Sich, and offered Bohdan Khmelnytsky and Zaporozhian Cossacks the chance to leave Zaporozhzhia and disperse. Khmelnytsky replied that it would happen if Potocki himself together with other Polish lords left Ukraine. Receiving such an answer Potocki in a great hurry moved with his army south.

The main element of Mikołaj Potocki was quartered in Cherkasy, while the Kalinowski's regiment stayed in Korsun, others in the estates of Crown Chorazy Aleksander Koniecpolski in Kaniv. The whole Crown Army, designated to suppress the uprising, accounted for less than 7,000 soldiers. Before departing the Sich, Khmelnytsky sent out Tugay Bey with part of his unit (500 cavalry) on patrol having the task of securing a safe passage to the Sich for other volunteers. After receiving intelligence that the Crown Army was heading for the Kodak fortress, Khmelnytsky decided to leave the Sich on 22 April 1648 with his main element (2,000 Cossacks) towards Kryliv and Chyhyryn.

== Background ==
Around 21–22 April 1648, word of an uprising had spread through the Polish-Lithuanian Commonwealth. Either because they underestimated the size of the uprising, or because they wanted to act quickly to prevent it from spreading, the Commonwealth's Grand Crown Hetman Mikołaj Potocki and Field Crown Hetman Marcin Kalinowski sent a vanguard of 3,500 soldiers under the command of Mikołaj Potocki's son, Stefan Potocki (in fact, commanded by Commissioner Szemberg and Lieutenant Czarniecki) deep into Cossack territory, without waiting to gather additional forces from Prince Jeremi Wiśniowiecki. Stefan's force consisted of 7 banners of dragoons (700–800 men), 11 banners of Cossack style cavalry (550 men) and 1 banner of Winged Hussars (150 men), the rest of his force was composed of about 2,000 registered Cossacks. While this group travelled by land, an additional detachment was sent down the Dnipro river in boats to join Stefan Potocki's forces in due course. These troops, under the command of Polkovnyk (colonel) Mykhailo Krychevsky, Stanislaw Wadowski, Stanislaw Gorski, Illiash Karaimovych and Ivan Barabash, were composed almost entirely of registered Cossacks (they also included about 80 of German dragoon) and numbered at around 3,500. According to other sources, the army numbered 5,000.

A unit of 5,000 soldiers remained with Hetman Mikołaj Potocki while he attempted to gather local reinforcements from the various private armies of the local magnates, as well as from the pospolite ruszenie of the militant szlachta (Polish nobility).

Stefan's force arrived first at the rendezvous point. It is likely that Krychevsky, en route, contacted Bohdan Khmelnytsky, his old friend (whom he helped to escape into Zaporozhian Sich a year earlier) and the leader of the uprising.

== Battle ==
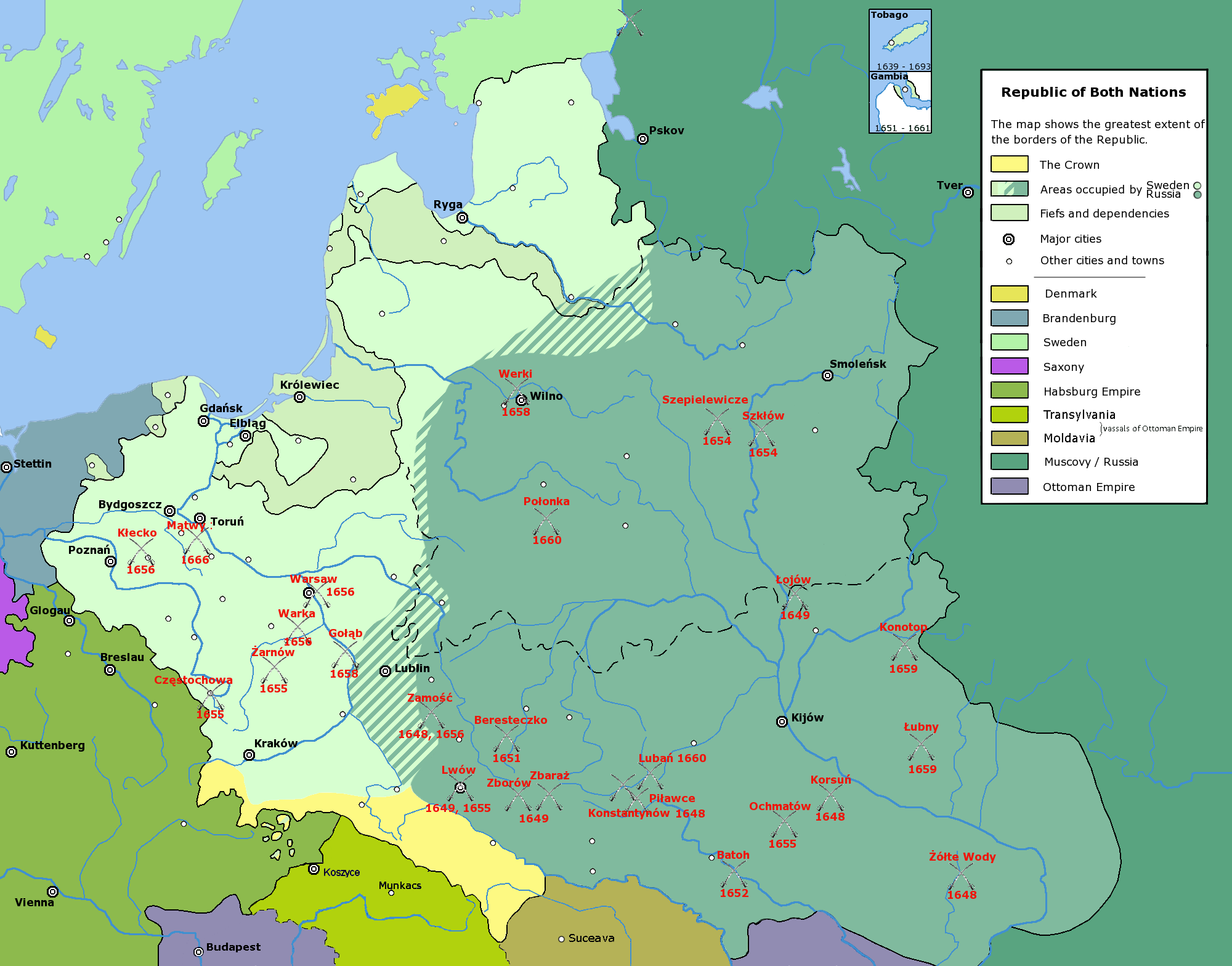
Map of the Commonwealth during the turbulent 1640s and 1650s. Enlarge for detailed view – Zhovti Vody (Żółte Wody) is the south-easternmost battle marked.

On 28 April 1648, Stefan Potocki's forces came upon Khmelnytsky's forces in an area near the present-day city of Zhovti Vody. Numbering 3,500 the Commonwealth's forces were greatly outnumbered at this point in comparison with Cossack-Tatar troops, which consisted of 4,000–5,000 Zaporozhian Cossacks, as well as of 3,000–4,000 Crimean Tatars under the command of Tugay Bey.

After the first small clashes between the Polish vanguard and Tatar scouts (27–29 April) Stefan Potocki arrived at Zhovti Vody and advised by Jacek Szemberk and Stefan Czarniecki ordered his force to establish a camp in the tabor formation, which allowed for a messenger to be sent to contact Hetman Mikołaj Potocki, while they defended themselves over the next two weeks. The presence of the Crimean Tatars was a surprise to the Crown Army, because they did not know about the Cossack-Tatar alliance. 29 April, Tatars attacked Polish troops (three banners of Cossack cavalry and 500–600 dragoons) that were before the tabor and after a short struggle forced the Poles to withdraw, the retreating Poles were duly supported by the next three Cossack banners and possibly by other banners. The Tatars were defeated and suffered significant losses, decided not to continue the fight and withdrew. From the captured prisoners, the Poles heard that the Tatars were 12,000 strong, with more soon to come. In the hurriedly convened council of war, Polish commanders concluded that in the face of significant numerical superiority of the enemy (numbering according to the exaggerated statements prisoners allegedly 12,000 Tatars) it was impossible to fight a battle in the open field. There were two options, withdraw in tabor formation to Kryliv, or remain in place in the fortified camp in anticipation of the arrival of the main force hetmans. The Poles chose to remain. Under the leadership of Jan Fryderyk Sapieha, the Poles began to fortify a camp near the water.

On 30 April 1648, the main Tatar force had arrived and four hours later the Cossack force joined them. Thereafter the Poles were encircled. On that day, there was no fighting. 1 May, Tatars and Cossacks decided to launch an attack from two sides on the Polish camp, after the initial firing of the camp, the Cossacks began their attack. They tried to distract the defenders from Tugay Bey attacking them from behind, but the Tatars were late and attacked at a time when the Cossacks (after two unsuccessful attacks) had already withdrawn. This made it possible to effectively repulse the Tatars. Later Bohdan Khmelnytsky and Tugay Bey still tried (4 or 5 times) to attack the Poles, but each time unsuccessfully. After a six-hour struggle, Tatars and Cossacks suffered significant losses and retreated. On the night of 1 May to 2 May, the Cossacks built near the Poles a rampart and placed their cannons, but at dawn, the defenders quickly attacked, seized the position, and destroyed the fortifications. A period of blockade began, interrupted by frequent fighting (during the day attacked by Tatars, and at night by Cossacks).

On 4 May 1648, near Kamianyi Zaton, Mykhailo Krychevsky's 1,500 registered Cossacks mutinied, killing all the officers (Krychevsky himself was taken prisoner and would join Khmelnytsky's army). Cossacks who stayed loyal to the Crown Army, such as Ivan Barabash, were cut down, as well as the German dragoons in their midst. Rebellious Cossacks arrived at the battlefield on 13 May. The next day, Stefan Potocki saw his already undermanned force dwindle to 1,000 men, when the 1,200 registered Cossacks and some dragoons who arrived with Stefan also joined the uprising. Polkovnyk Ivan Hanzha is recognized as being instrumental in swaying his fellow registered Cossacks into taking Khmelnytsky's side. This created a gap in the Polish defense which the Cossacks attacked, supported by Tatars, but the attack was repulsed. At this point, Khmelnytsky's army swelled to more than 11,000. Despite the overwhelming numerical superiority, gaining Polish ramparts was not an easy task, especially in the absence of heavy artillery on the side of the Cossacks. Therefore, the Tatars and Cossacks decided to capture the Polish camp by guile. On the same day Tugay Bey proposed Poles negotiations.

The hetmans, with an additional 4,000 strong army halted past Chyhyryn, built fortifications, but after news of the mutiny they retreated to the "settled area to their rear" and north of Chyhyryn on 13 May N.S.

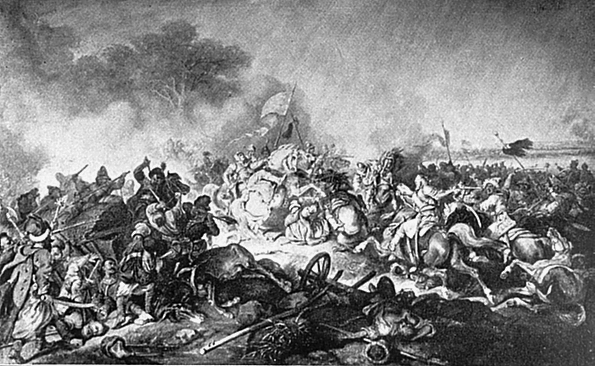
"Death of Stefan Potocki at the Battle of Zhovti Vody" by Juliusz Kossak

The Commonwealth's army managed to hold off from being overrun; this was due in part to their superior artillery. On 13 May 1648, Bohdan Khmelnytsky met with representatives of Stefan Potocki, who debated turning over their artillery in exchange for safe passage.

Soon to Cossacks were sent deputies (Stefan Czarnecki, hostage-Cossack was Maksym Kryvonis). Khmelnytsky put up tough requirements: give to the Cossacks the Polish cannons, banners, and Commissioner Szemberg. The Poles agreed on everything except to give up Szemberg. Finally, an agreement was made. In return for the cannons, the Poles would receive safe passage. However, after giving up the cannons, Khmelnytsky broke the agreement, imprisoned the deputies imprisoned, and Colonel Maksym Kryvonis escaped. The next day there was an attempt to break out of the encirclement, Poles along with tabor began to walk towards the small fortified town Kryliv. They were, however, stopped at the cost of hundreds of soldiers captured by the Tatars. The Cossacks launched an assault but were repulsed. This was followed by another assault, the fighting continued until the evening and the Cossacks were repulsed again. Poles again decided to break through to Kryliv. 16 May, after 1:00 a.m.

The Poles managed to get out of the encirclement, but the Tatars heard about the marching Poles and began to pursue. The Tatars attacked the Poles but were repulsed, Tugay Bey all night long trying to attack but without success. At dawn Polish wagons move on Kniazhi Bairaky, Cossacks are only now arrived at the place and began artillery fire on Poles, Tatars forced the Cossacks to stop firing because they wanted to taking as much as possible captives. Again Tatars and Cossacks rushed to the assault in which Stefan Potocki was wounded and Jan Sapieha took command but the attack was repulsed. A moment later began the second attack which was successful. The Commonwealth forces were surprised by a hail of arrows from Tugay Bey's Tatar forces, which diverted their escape route towards the nearby fortified village of Kniazhi Bairaky (today a tract in Kamianske Raion). There the combined forces of Tatar horsemen and Cossacks under the command of Khmelnytsky's Colonel Maksym Olshansky (aka "Crook-nose", Kryvonis, or Perebyinis) overwhelmed Potocki's tabor formation and thoroughly destroyed the fleeing force. 300 towarzysz and soldiers were taken prisoner. From the battlefield fled only one soldier but other source says that survived more soldiers.

Hetman Mikołaj Potocki, who had received word on 3 May 1648, of his son's plight, could not move his forces in time to reinforce the Commonwealth's position, with his forces getting to within 100 km from the site of the battle.

== Aftermath ==
The majority of the Commonwealth's forces either died in battle or were killed shortly thereafter. Stefan Potocki was wounded, taken prisoner of war and died from wounds. His advisor, Stefan Czarniecki, was also taken prisoner, although he managed to escape soon thereafter.

Cossack commander of the Registered Cossacks, Stanisław Krzyczewski defected to the Zaporozhian Host after being ransomed by Bohdan Khmelnytsky from Crimean Tatar captivity. Bolstered by their victory, the Zaporozhian Cossack and Crimean Tatar forces engaged with the troops of Hetman Mikołaj Potocki and defeated them at the Battle of Korsun.

== Legacy ==
=== Monuments ===
Distinguishing the 350th Anniversary of Khmelnytsky Uprising, a monument commemorating the victory of Cossack and Tatar forces was erected near the village of Zhovto-Oleksandrivka, Kamianske Raion (Dnipropetrovsk Region), depicting two coats of arms: Bohdan Khmelnytsky's and İslâm III Giray's. The monument's authors are an architect Volodymyr Shulha and a sculptor Stepan Zhyliak.

=== In popular culture ===
The battle was very inaccurately portrayed in the 1999 film With Fire and Sword by Polish film director Jerzy Hoffman. Although the film paid much attention to historical details, the attempt to summarize the weeks-long battle in a few minutes meant that the battle as shown in the movie – reduced to the failed hussars' charge – had little in common with what had really happened, especially as the hussar forces in reality proved to be the backbone of Polish resistance during this 18-day battle.

== Bibliography ==
- Holobutsky, V. Zaporizhian Cossackdom. "Vyshcha shkola". Kyiv, 1994. ISBN 5-11-003970-4 (http://litopys.org.ua/holob/hol.htm)
- Chrząszcz, J. Pierwszy okres buntu Chmielnickiego w oswietleniu uczestnika wyprawy Zoltowodzkiej // Prace historyczne w 30-lecie dzialanosci prof. St. Zakrzewskiego. Lwów, 1894.
- Doroshenko, D. Outline of History of Ukraine. Vol.2. Warsaw, 1933.
- Kubala, L. Szkice historyczne. Vol.3.
- Chronicles of Samiilo Velychko. Vol.1.
- Paly, Alexander (2017). Історія України [History of Ukraine] (in Ukrainian). Vol. 3. Kyiv: К.І.С. ISBN 978-617-684-166-1.
