= Matveyevsky =

Matveyevsky (masculine), Matveyevskaya (feminine), or Matveyevskoye (neuter) may refer to:

- Matveyevsky District, a district of Orenburg Oblast, Russia
- Matveyevsky (rural locality) (Matveyevskaya, Matveyevskoye), name of several rural localities in Russia

== See also ==
- Matveyevka (disambiguation)
