= Stefan Potocki =

Stefan Potocki may refer to:

- Stefan Potocki, voivode of Bratslav (1568-1631), governor of Bratslav, starost of Fellin, played a role in the Moldavian Magnate Wars
- Stefan Potocki (1624–1648), Polish nobleman, starost of Niżyn
- Stefan Aleksander Potocki (1651/1652-1726/1727), Polish nobleman, starost of Belz
