= Tugay Bey =

Military leader and politician of the Crimean Tatars (1601–1651)

Togay Bey
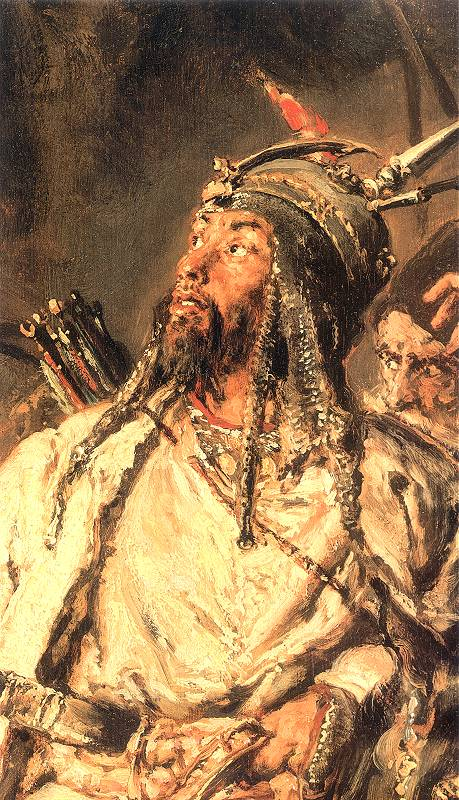
- Toğay Bey, by Jan Matejko

Or Bey
- In office 1644 – June 1651
- Monarch: İslâm III Giray

Personal details
- Born: Arğın Doğan Toğay
- Died: June 1651
- Family: Argyns

Military service
- Allegiance: Crimean Khanate
- Battles/wars: Crimean–Nogai slave raids in Eastern Europe; Battle of Ochmatów; Khmelnytsky Uprising; Khmelnytsky's campaign; Battle of Zhovti Vody; Battle of Korsuń; Battle of Pyliavtsi; Battle of Berestechko †

Mirza Tughai Bey, Tuhay Bey (Crimean Tatar: Toğay bey; Polish: Tuhaj-bej; Russian: Тугай-бей, romanized: Tugay-bey; died June 1651), also spelled Togay Bey, was a notable military leader and politician of the Crimean Tatars.

== Biography ==
Toğay descended from the Arğıns - one of noble Crimean families, and his full name is Arğın Doğan Toğay bey (Arhyn Dohan Tohai bei). "Bey" is actually a title, which he received on becoming the chief of Or Qapı (Perekop) sanjak, an important position in the Crimean Khanate, since the Isthmus of Perekop is the neck to Crimean Peninsula and was crucial to its defense.

Tuhay Bey became the bey of Or Qapı sometime between 1642 and 1644, an important position of the Crimean Khanate who was in charge of Or Qapı fortress - the gateway to the peninsula. By 1644 he had enough authority for the Khan of Crimea to entrust to him leadership of the major Tatar expedition against Poland. However, Tuhay Bey's army was intercepted by the Polish army under hetman Koniecpolski before reaching the densely populated regions of Ukraine and defeated in the First Battle of Okhmativ.

In 1648, he brought an army (estimated 6,000–20,000) to help Bohdan Khmelnytsky during the Cossack uprising against the Polish–Lithuanian Commonwealth. There he took part in several important battles and was eventually killed during the Battle of Berestechko.

He was portrayed in the Polish novel and film With Fire and Sword. In the film, he was played by Daniel Olbrychski. In his third novel, Pan Wołodyjowski, Henryk Sienkiewicz introduced a fictional character - Tuhay Bey's son - Azja. He was played by Daniel Olbrychski in the 1969 film adaptation Colonel Wolodyjowski.

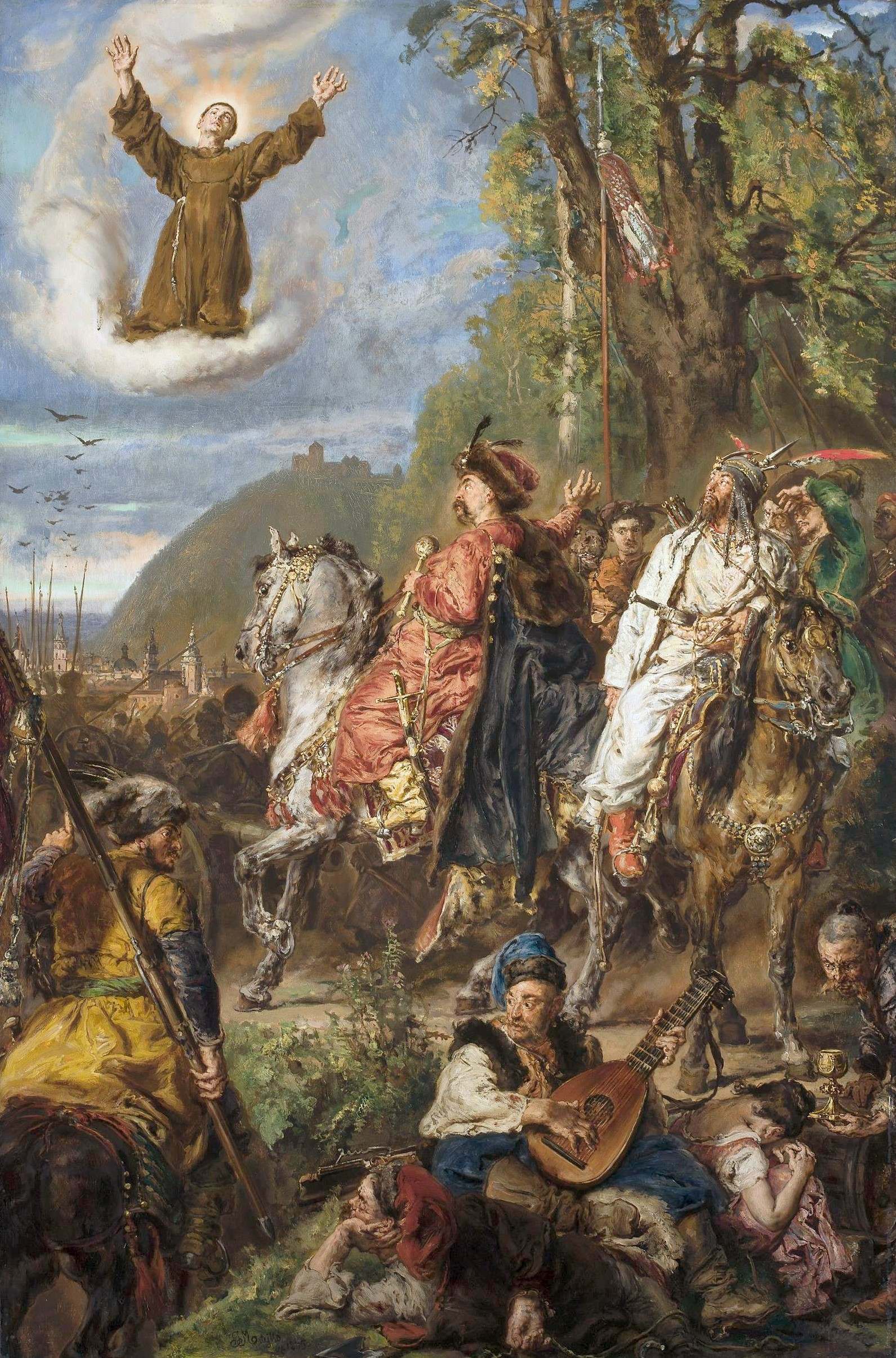
An imagined painting of " Bohdan Khmelnytsky with Tuhay Bey at Lviv", oil on canvas by Jan Matejko, 1885.

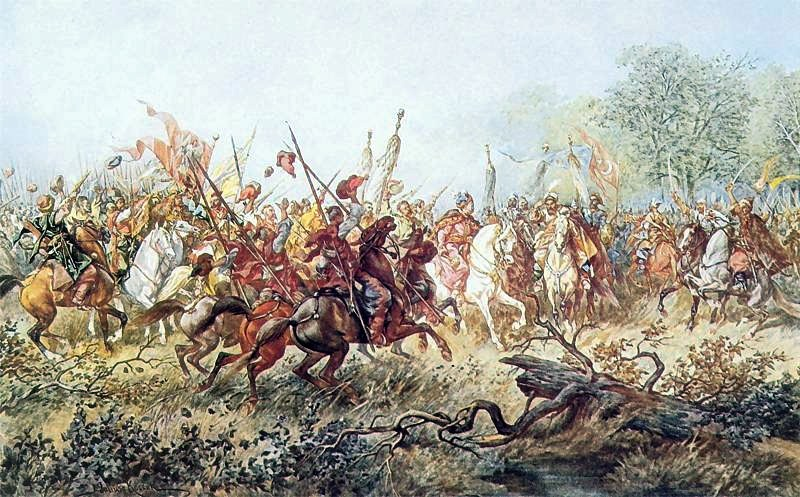
Tugai Bey leads the Tatar cavalry.

== Bibliography ==
- Podhorodecki, L. Chanat krymski i jego stosunki z Polską w 15-18 w. Warsaw, 1987.
- Serczyk, W.A. Na płonącej Ukrainie. Dzieje Kozaczyzny 1648-1651. Warsaw, 1998.
- Holobutsky, V. Zaporizhian Cossackdom. "Vyshcha shkola". Kyiv, 1994. ISBN 5-11-003970-4 (http://litopys.org.ua/holob/hol.htm)
