= Chyhyryn urban hromada =

Urban hromada of Cherkasy Oblast, Ukraine

Coordinates: 49°06′N 32°37′E

Chyhyryn urban hromada Чигиринська міська громада
- Hromada
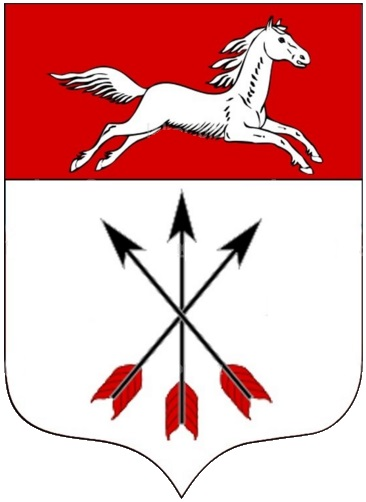
- Seal
- Interactive map of Chyhyryn urban hromada
- Country: Ukraine
- Oblast: Cherkasy
- Raion: Cherkasy

Area
  - Total: 481.02 km^{2} (185.72 sq mi)

Population (2018)
  - Total: 14,254
  - Density: 29.633/km^{2} (76.749/sq mi)
- Settlements: 25
- Cities: 1
- Rural settlements: 5
- Villages: 19
- Website: chigirinskaotg.gov.ua

Chyhyryn urban territorial hromada (Ukrainian: Чигиринська міська територіальна громада, romanized: Chyhyrynska miska terytorialna hromada) is one of the hromadas of Ukraine, in Cherkasy Raion within Cherkasy Oblast. Its administrative centre is the city of Chyhyryn.

== Composition ==
In addition to one city (Chyhyryn), the hromada contains 5 rural settlements and 19 villages:

- Buriakove
- Cherneche
- Chmyrivka
- Halahanivka
- Hnenne
- Krasnosillia
- Kudasheve
- Matviivka
- Novoselytsia
- Pohoriltsi
- Poludnivka
- Ratseve
- Rozsoshyntsi
- Rublivka
- Skarzhynka
- Stetsivka
- Subotiv
- Taraso-Hryhorivka
- Tinky
- Trushivtsi
- Vdovychyne
- Vershatsi
- Vitove
- Yanychi
