= Subotiv =

Ukrainian village

Subotiv Суботів
- Village
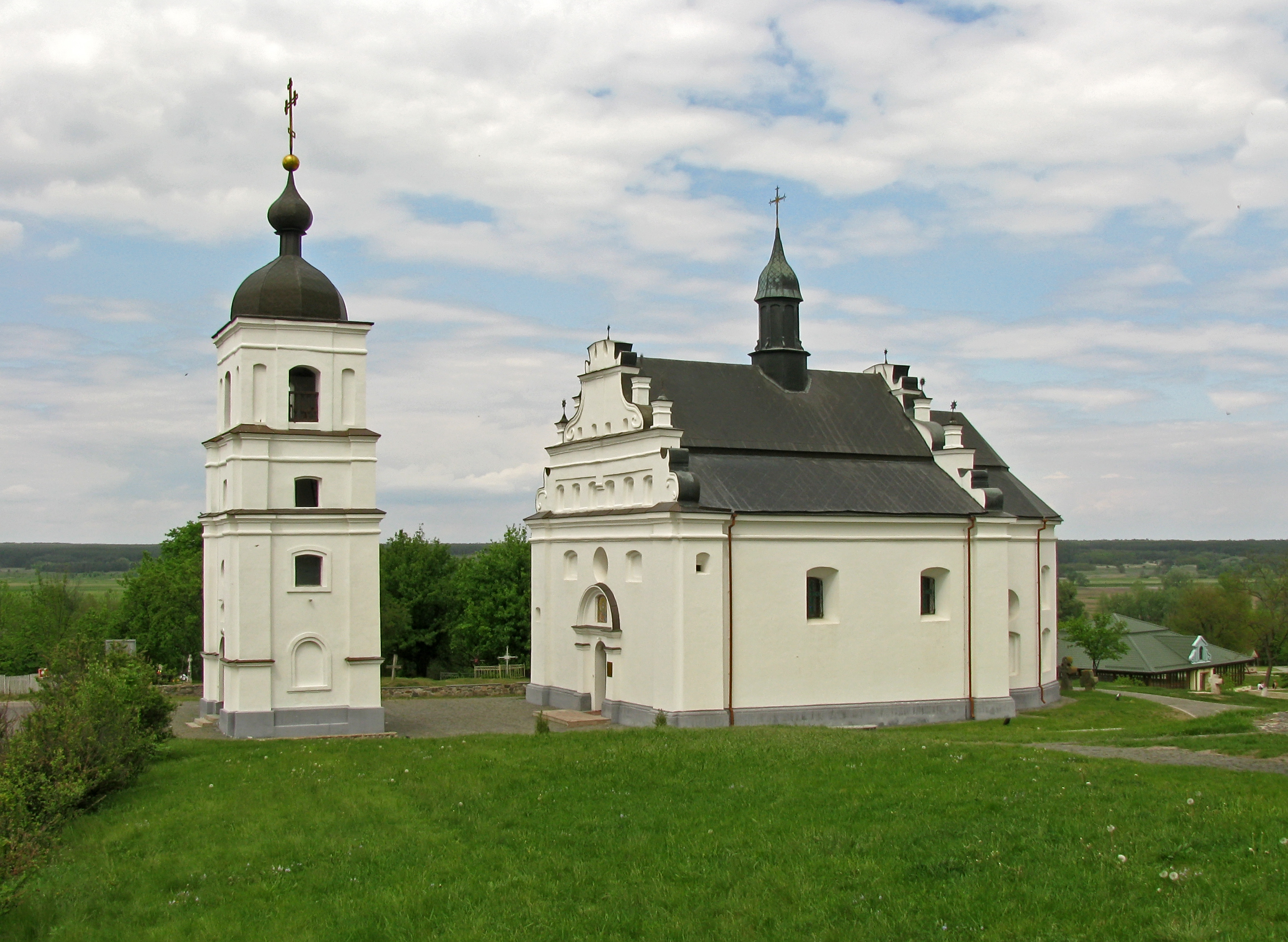
- St. Elijah Church

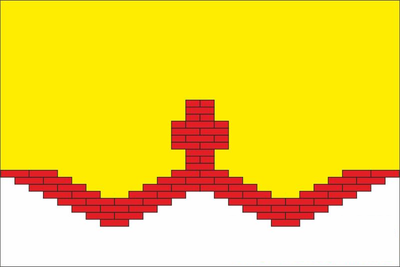
- Flag Coat of arms

- Location within Cherkasy Oblast Location within Ukraine
- Coordinates: 49°05′46″N 32°33′20″E
- Country: Ukraine
- Oblast: Cherkasy Oblast
- Raion: Cherkasy Raion
- Hromada: Chyhyryn urban hromada
- Founded: 1616

Government
  - Village head: Ivan Hryshko
- Elevation: 83 m (272 ft)

Population
  - Total: 875
- Time zone: UTC+2 (EET)
  - Summer (DST): UTC+3 (EEST)
- Postal code: 20940
- Area code: +380 47-3093
- Website: Verkhovna Rada website

Subotiv (Ukrainian: Суботів) is a village in central Ukraine. It is located in Cherkasy Raion, Cherkasy Oblast, near the town of Chyhyryn. It belongs to Chyhyryn urban hromada, which is administered from Chyhyryn.

Until 18 July 2020, Subotiv belonged to Chyhyryn Raion. The raion was abolished in July 2020 as part of the administrative reform of Ukraine, and its area was merged into Cherkasy Raion.

The village is located on the right bank of the Tiasmyn River, a tributary of the Dnieper, 7 km from Chyhyryn, 21 km from Adamivka river port, and 38 km from Fundukliivka railway station. A local auto road 2414 runs through the village.

The village name, Subotiv, according to one legend, took its roots from a live fire from oak firewood (known as "subotka") that was in front of Perun. According to another legend, it came from the name of the place where water from two tributaries combines (known as "subod'").

== History ==
Based on archeological studies, the place was settled as early as Bronze Age. At the place there are also traces of Early Slavic, and Kyivan Rus settlements. In the documents the first known reference to the village is dated back to early 17th century.

== Famous places ==
- St. Elijah Church, a church built by the order of Bohdan Khmelnytsky in 1653. It is also the place where Khmelnytsky is buried. The church is pictured on one of the paintings by Taras Shevchenko in 1845. The church is also pictured on 5 Ukrainian hryvnia banknote.
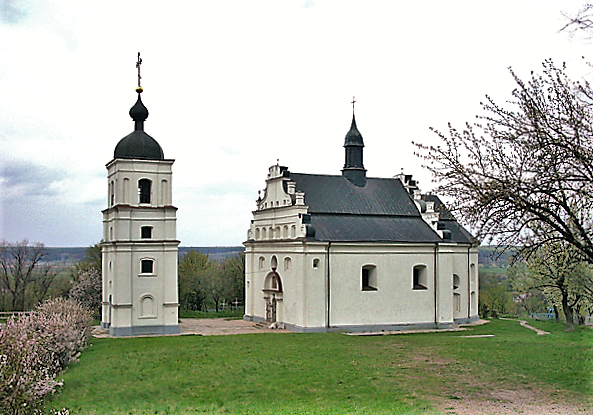
St. Elijah Church, the birthplace of Ukrainian Hetman Bohdan Khmelnytsky.

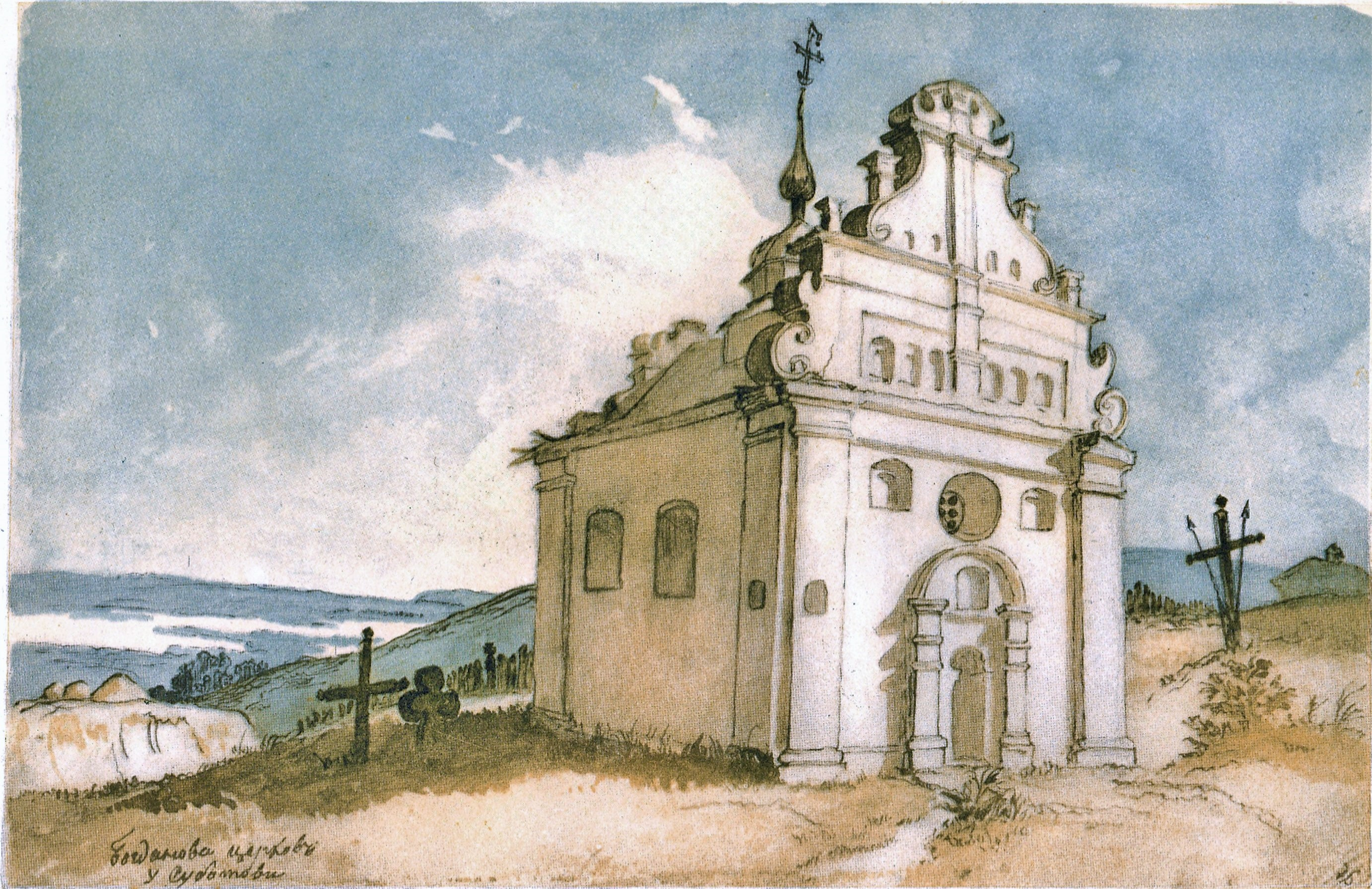
Taras Shevchenko. Bohdan's church in Subotiv. 1845. Paper. Water-colour.

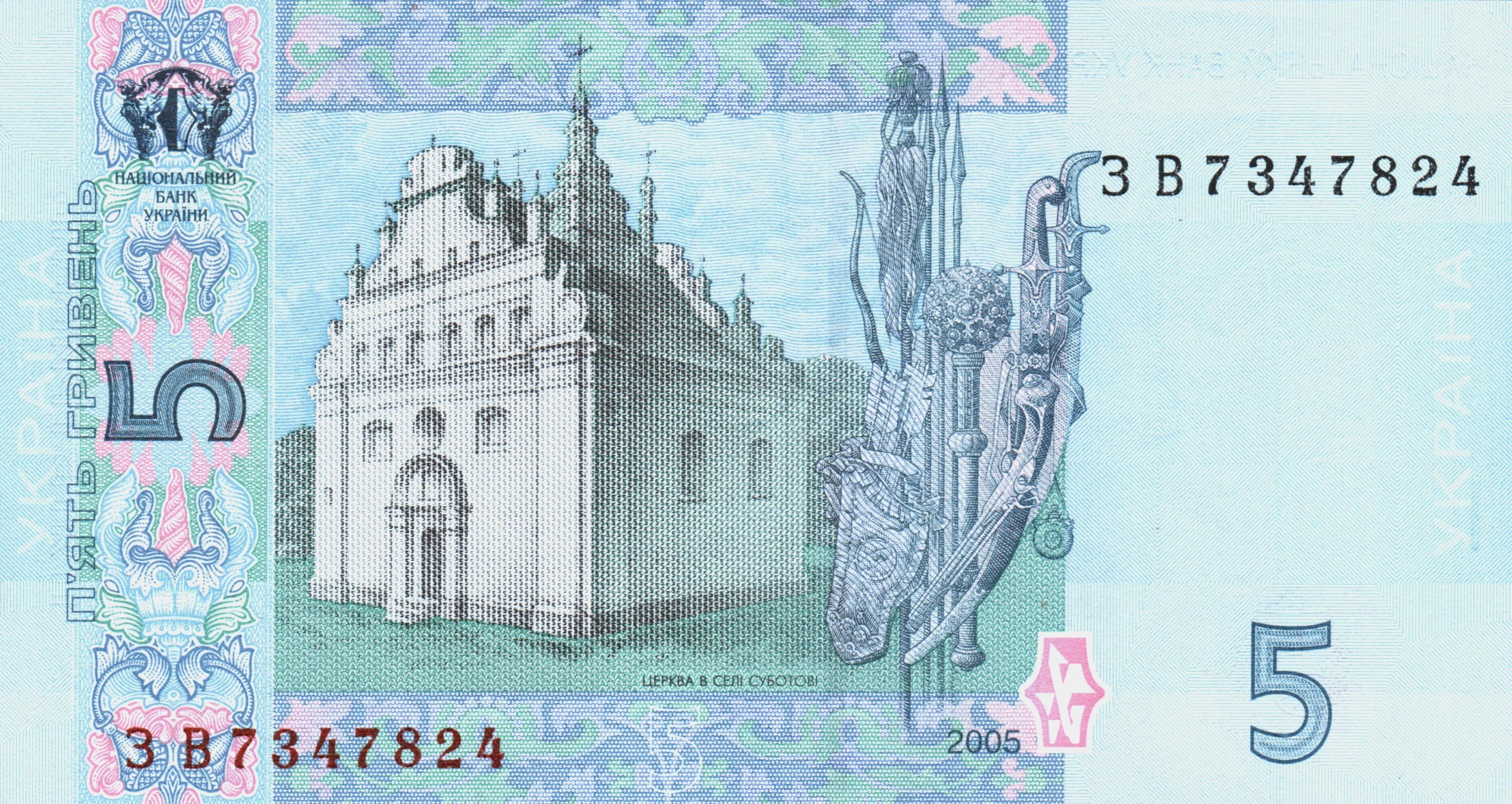
The Subotiv church on the ₴5 banknote.

== Notable people ==
- Bohdan Khmelnytsky (ca.1595–1657), a Ukrainian military commander and Hetman of Zaporizhian Host.
