= Tiasmyn =

Tiasmyn, Тясмин
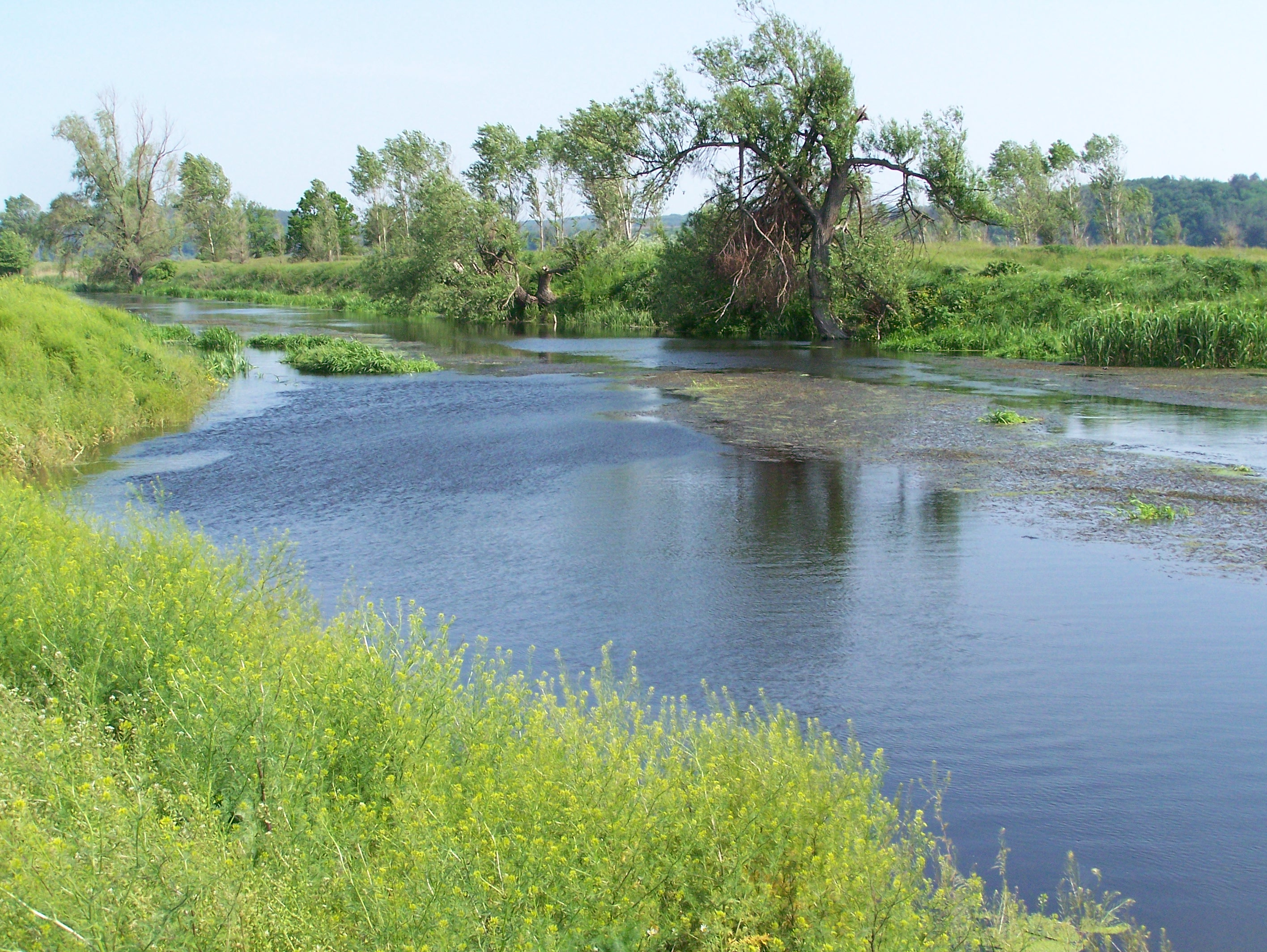
- The Tiasmyn

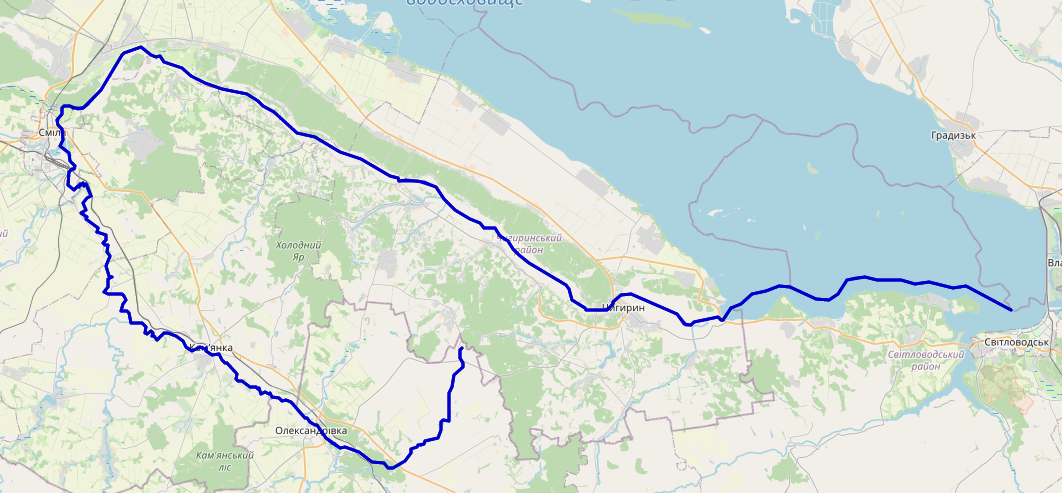

Location
- Country: Ukraine

Physical characteristics
- Source
  - location: Kirovohrad Oblast
- Mouth: Dnieper
  - location: Kremenchuk Reservoir
  - coordinates: 49°03′55″N 32°48′13″E
- Length: 161 km (100 mi)
- Basin size: 4,540 km^{2} (1,750 sq mi)

Basin features
- Progression: Dnieper→ Dnieper–Bug estuary→ Black Sea

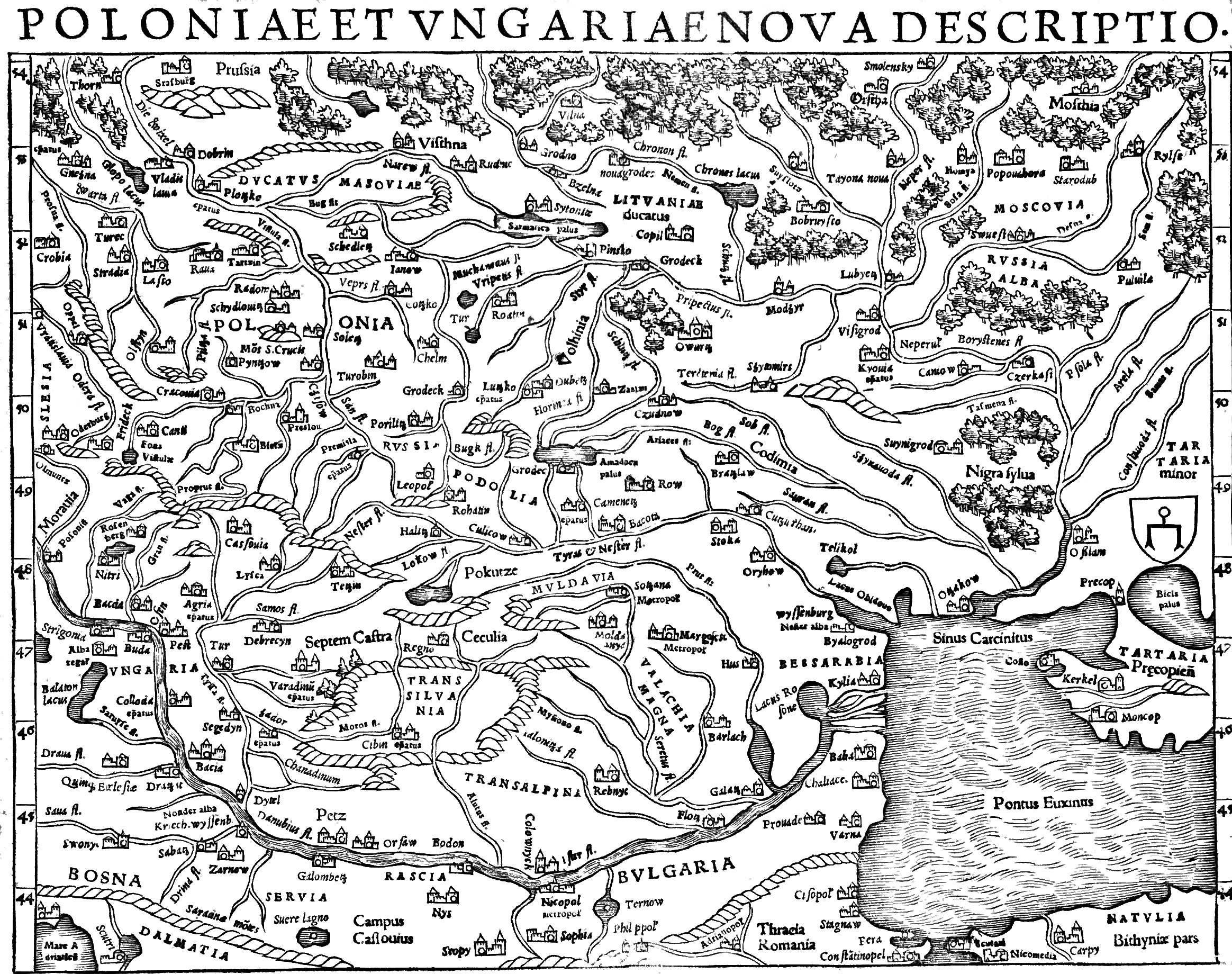
Tasmena, a left tributary of Neperus/Borystenes (1554) by Sebastian Munster

The Tiasmyn (Ukrainian: Тясмин) is a right tributary of the Dnieper River in Ukraine. It is 161 kilometres (100 mi) long, and has a drainage basin of 4,540 square kilometres (1,750 sq mi). The Tiasmyn originates in the north central part of the Dnieper hills in the central Ukrainian province of Kirovohrad. From there it flows through the Cherkasy Oblast, where it finally flows into the Kremenchuk Reservoir. The river forms a U-turn (180°) in its central run. Not counting the river's sharp turn, the river's source and its delta are located only 33 km (21 mi) away from each other.

Along the river's lower section there are important discovery sites of the Bilogrudivka/Chernoles culture near the settlement of Subotiv. These findings represent key late Bronze Age discoveries.

Cities and towns located on the river include: Kamianka, Smila, and Chyhyryn.
