= Chyhyryn Raion =

Former subdivision of Cherkasy Oblast, Ukraine

- Raion
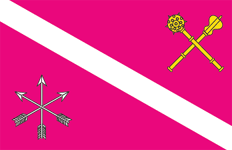
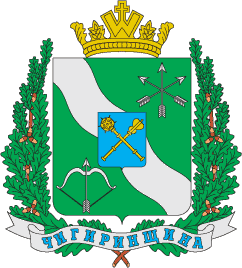
- Flag Coat of arms

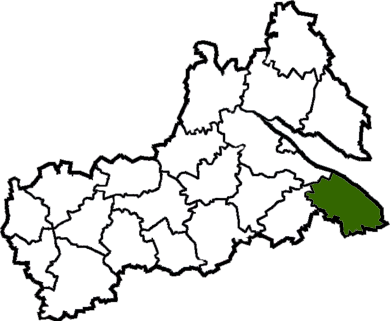
- Raion location in Cherkasy Oblast
- Coordinates: 49°9′43.9″N 32°30′27.5″E
- Country: Ukraine
- Region: Cherkasy Oblast
- Disestablished: 18 July 2020
- Admin. center: Chyhyryn
- Subdivisions: List: — city councils; — settlement councils; — rural councils; Number of localities: — cities; — urban-type settlements; — villages; — rural settlements

Population (2020)
  - Total: 25,410
- Time zone: UTC+02:00 (EET)
  - Summer (DST): UTC+03:00 (EEST)
- Area code: +380

Chyhyryn Raion (Ukrainian: Чигиринський район) was a raion (district) of Cherkasy Oblast, central Ukraine. Its administrative centre was located at the town of Chyhyryn. The raion was abolished on 18 July 2020 as part of the administrative reform of Ukraine, which reduced the number of raions of Cherkasy Oblast to four. The area of Chyhyryn Raion was merged into Cherkasy Raion. The last estimate of the raion population was 25,410 (2020 est.)

At the time of disestablishment, the raion consisted of two hromadas, Chyhyryn urban hromada with the administration in Chyhyryn and Medvedivka rural hromada with the administration in the selo of Medvedivka.

During the Ukrainian War of Independence the region was proclaimed the "Kholodny Yar Republic" (led by local Vasyl Chuchupak) which strived for Ukrainian independence from the Soviet Union. The Kholodny Yar Republic lasted from 1919 to 1922.
