= Matviivka =

Matviivka (Ukrainian: Матвіївка) may refer to several villages in Ukraine:

- Matviivka, Crimea
- Matviivka, Melitopol Raion, Zaporizhzhia Oblast
- Matviivka, Zaporizhzhia Raion, Zaporizhzhia Oblast
- Matviivka, Kyiv Oblast
- Matviivka, Kirovohrad Oblast
- Matviivka, Luhansk Oblast
- Matviivka, Poltava Raion, Poltava Oblast
- Matviivka, Kremenchuk Raion, Poltava Oblast
- Matviivka, Kharkiv Oblast
- Matviivka, Zolotonosha Raion, Cherkasy Oblast
- Matviivka, Cherkasy Raion, Cherkasy Oblast
- Matviivka, Chernihiv Oblast

== See also ==
- Matveyevka (disambiguation), a list of localities in Russia with the equivalent Russian-language name
