= Matveyevka, Republic of Bashkortostan =

Matveyevka Матвеевка
- Village
- Location within Bashkortostan Location within Russia
- Coordinates: 53°51′N 55°32′E
- Country: Russia
- Region: Bashkortostan
- District: Sterlitamaksky District
- Time zone: UTC+5:00

Matveyevka (Russian: Матвеевка) is a rural locality (a village) in Pervomaysky Selsoviet, Sterlitamaksky District, Bashkortostan, Russia. The population was 206 as of 2010. There are four streets in the village.

== Geography ==
Matveyevka is located 23 km southwest of Sterlitamak, the district's administrative centre, by road.
