= Matveyevskaya, Verkhovsky Selsoviet, Verkhovazhsky District, Vologda Oblast =

Matveyevskaya Матвеевская
- Village
- Location within Vologda Oblast Location within Russia
- Coordinates: 60°39′N 41°49′E
- Country: Russia
- Region: Vologda Oblast
- District: Verkhovazhsky District
- Time zone: UTC+3:00

Matveyevskaya (Russian: Матвеевская) is a rural locality (a village) in Verkhovskoye Rural Settlement, Verkhovazhsky District, Vologda Oblast, Russia. The population was 8 as of 2002.

== Geography ==
The distance to Verkhovazhye is 19.5 km, to Smetanino is 3.5 km. Kalinino, Smetanino, Otvodnitsa are the nearest rural localities.
