= Matveyevskoye, Sheksninsky District, Vologda Oblast =

Matveyevskoye Матвеевское
- Village
- Location within Vologda Oblast Location within Russia
- Coordinates: 59°22′N 38°28′E
- Country: Russia
- Region: Vologda Oblast
- District: Sheksninsky District
- Time zone: UTC+3:00

Matveyevskoye (Russian: Матвеевское) is a rural locality (a village) in Sizemskoye Rural Settlement, Sheksninsky District, Vologda Oblast, Russia. The population was 8 as of 2002.

== Geography ==
Matveyevskoye is located 35 km north of Sheksna (the district's administrative centre) by road. Yakunina Gora is the nearest rural locality.
