= Matveyevskaya, Nyuksensky District, Vologda Oblast =

Matveyevskaya Матвеевская
- Village
- Location within Vologda Oblast Location within Russia
- Coordinates: 60°13′N 44°25′E
- Country: Russia
- Region: Vologda Oblast
- District: Nyuksensky District
- Time zone: UTC+3:00

Matveyevskaya (Russian: Матвеевская) is a rural locality (a village) in Gorodishchenskoye Rural Settlement, Nyuksensky District, Vologda Oblast, Russia. The population was 139 as of 2002.

== Geography ==
Matveyevskaya is located 41 km southeast of Nyuksenitsa (the district's administrative centre) by road. Kosmarevskaya Kuliga is the nearest rural locality.
