= Matveyevka, Konyshyovsky District, Kursk Oblast =

Rural locality in Kursk Oblast, Russia

Matveyevka Матвеевка
- Village
- Interactive map of Matveyevka
- Location of Matveyevka Matveyevka (Kursk Oblast)
- Coordinates: 51°58′51″N 35°14′34″E
- Country: Russia
- Federal subject: Kursk Oblast
- Administrative district: Konyshyovsky District
- SelsovietSelsoviet: Mashkinsky

Population (2010 Census)
  - Total: 10
  - Estimate (2010): 10 (0%)

Municipal status
  - Municipal district: Konyshyovsky Municipal District
  - Rural settlement: Mashkinsky Selsoviet Rural Settlement
- Time zone: UTC+3 (MSK)
- Postal code: 307610
- Dialing code: +7 47156
- OKTMO ID: 38616428116
- Website: машкинский.рф

Matveyevka (Russian: Матвеевка) is a rural locality (Russian: деревня, lit. 'village') in Mashkinsky Selsoviet Rural Settlement, Konyshyovsky District, Kursk Oblast, Russia. Population: 10 (2010 census); 43 (2002 census);

== Geography ==
The village is located on the Belichka River (a left tributary of the Svapa River), 59.5 km from the Russia–Ukraine border, 70 km north-west of Kursk, 16 km north-west of the district center – the urban-type settlement Konyshyovka, 6 km from the selsoviet center – Mashkino.

Climate

Matveyevka has a warm-summer humid continental climate (Dfb in the Köppen climate classification).

== Transport ==
Matveyevka is located 52 km from the federal route M-3 Ukraine Highway, 41 km from the route M-2 Crimea Highway, 25 km from the route A-142 (Trosna – M3 highway), 9.5 km from the road of regional importance 38K-038 (Fatezh – Dmitriyev), 9 km from the road 38K-005 (Konyshyovka – Zhigayevo – 38K-038), 1.5 km from the road of intermunicipal significance 38Н-141 (38K-005 – Verkhoprudka), 3 km from the nearest railway halt 543 km (railway line Navlya – Lgov-Kiyevsky).

The rural locality is situated 76 km from Kursk Vostochny Airport, 174 km from Belgorod International Airport and 275 km from Voronezh Peter the Great Airport.
