= Matveyevka, Vladimir Oblast =

Matveyevka Матвеевка
- Village
- Location within Vladimir Oblast Location within Russia
- Coordinates: 55°54′N 41°35′E
- Country: Russia
- Region: Vladimir Oblast
- District: Selivanovsky District
- Time zone: UTC+3:00

Matveyevka (Russian: Матвеевка) is a rural locality (a village) in Volosatovskoye Rural Settlement, Selivanovsky District, Vladimir Oblast, Russia. The population was 26 as of 2010.

== Geography ==
Matveyevka is located on the Kolp River, 15 km northwest of Krasnaya Gorbatka (the district's administrative centre) by road. Kopnino is the nearest rural locality.
