= Stefan Potocki (1624–1648) =

Polish nobleman

- Coat of arms: Clan Piława
- Born: c. 1624
- Died: May 19, 1648 (aged 23–24) near Tawań
- Noble family: Potocki
- Father: Mikołaj Potocki
- Mother: Zofia Firlej

Stefan Potocki (c. 1624 – 19 May 1648 near Tawań) was a Polish nobleman, starosta (tenant of the Crown lands) of Niżyn.

== Family ==
Stefan Potocki was member of the Potocki family. He was a son of Mikołaj Potocki and his first wife Zofia Firlej.

He was single.

== Life ==
In the Battle of Zhovti Vody Stefan Potocki was wounded, taken prisoner of war and died from gangrene on May 19, 1648.

== Legacy ==
Julian Ursyn Niemcewicz wrote Duma o Stefanie Potockim. Stefan Potocki was portrayed by Henryk Sienkiewicz in With Fire and Sword (1884).

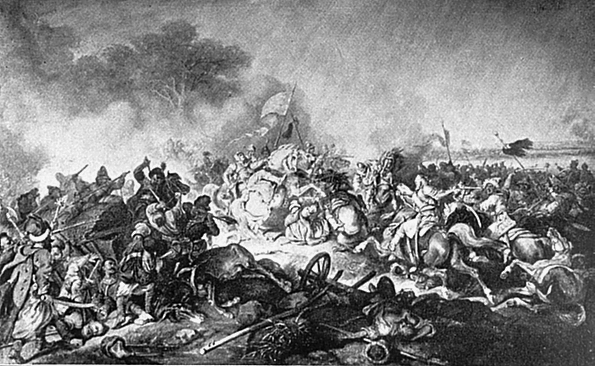
Juliusz Kossak: Death of Stefan Potocki at the Battle of Zhovti Vody 1648
