= Chyhyryn =

Town in Cherkasy Oblast, Ukraine

Chyhyryn Чигирин
- City
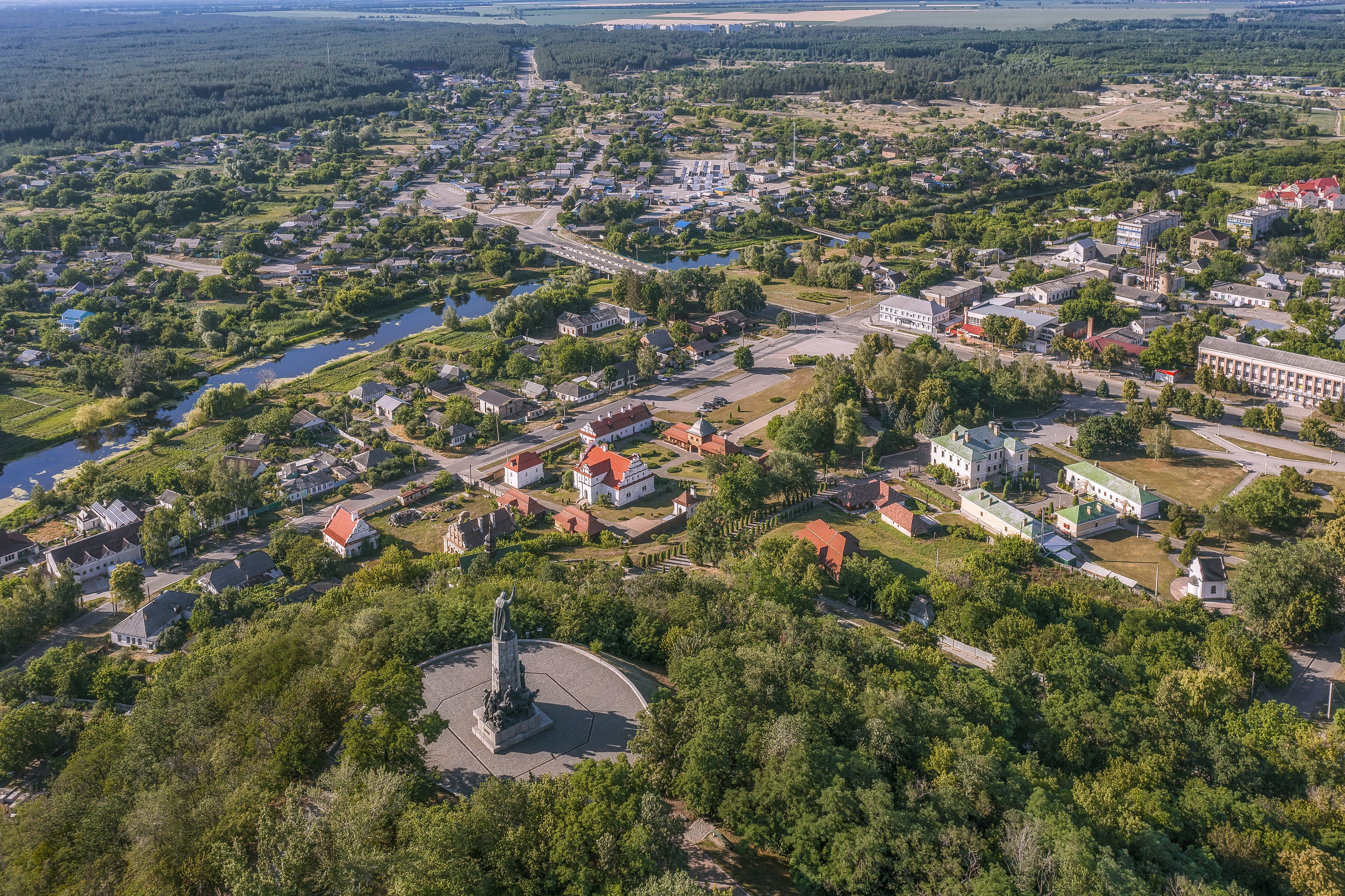
- View of Chyhyryn

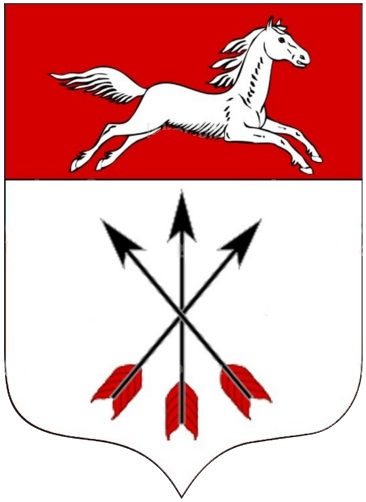
- Flag Coat of arms

- Location of Chyhyryn Chyhyryn (Ukraine)
- Coordinates: 49°04′38″N 32°38′57″E
- Country: Ukraine
- Oblast: Cherkasy Oblast
- Raion: Cherkasy Raion
- Hromada: Chyhyryn urban hromada
- City rights: 1592

Government
  - Mayor: Serhiy Oleksiiovych Tymchenko

Area
  - Total: 14 km^{2} (5.4 sq mi)
- Elevation: 124 m (407 ft)

Population (2022)
  - Total: 8,539
  - Density: 854/km^{2} (2,210/sq mi)
- Postal code: 20900-20906
- Area code: +380 4730

Chyhyryn (Ukrainian: Чигирин [tʃɪɦɪˈrɪn]; Polish: Czehryń [ˈt͡ʂɛxrɨɲ, ˈt͡ʂɛxrɨj̃]) is a city in Cherkasy Raion, Cherkasy Oblast, central Ukraine. It is located on Tiasmyn river not far where it enters the Dnieper.

From 1648 to 1669, the city served as the residence of the hetman of the Zaporizhian Host. After a forced relocation of the Ruthenian Orthodox metropolitan see from Kyiv in 1658, it became a full-fledged capital of the Cossack Hetmanate. Among Metropolitans who served out of Chyhyryn were Dionysius Balaban and Joseph Tukalskyi-Nelyubovych. Chyhyryn also became a traditional place for the appointment to the office of the hetman of the Zaporizhian Host.

Since the 17th century, the significance of the settlement has diminished to a semi-rural populated place. It hosts the administration of Chyhyryn urban hromada, one of the hromadas of Ukraine. Population: 8,539 (2022 estimate).

== Names ==
Chyhyryn (Ukrainian: Чигирин; Turkish: Çigirin or Çehrin; Russian: Чигирин; Polish: Czehryń). On older maps it is often shown in Polish/Turkish-like transcription Czehrin (see Ch (digraph)).

== History ==
=== Establishment of the city ===
From 1320 to 1569, the area had been part of the Grand Duchy of Lithuania. It was ceded to the Kingdom of Poland (in the Kijów Voivodeship of the Crown of Poland) before the Union of Lublin. In 1589, King Sigismund III of Poland granted a privilege to the Starosta of Cherkasy, Aleksander Wiśniowiecki, allowing him to establish a town and build a castle on a deserted site called Czehryn. The castle was erected on a hill surrounded by the Tiasmyn River, and the town was built around it. In 1592, a subsequent royal privilege granted the town Magdeburg rights as well as a coat of arms featuring three arrows.

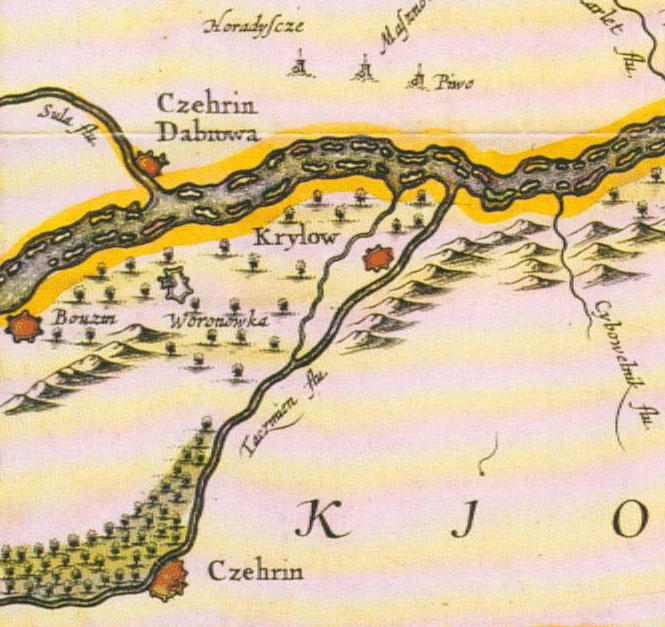
Chyhyryn on the Tiasmyn. A fragment of the Tractus Borysthenis Vulgo Dniepr at Niepr dicti map by Joannii Janssonii (Amsterdam, 1663)

Chyhyryn likely suffered during the Cossack uprisings, as in 1611 it was granted exemption from taxes along with the nearby settlement of Danielgród. Shortly thereafter, the town was transferred from the Cherkasy Starostwo to that of Kaniv. From its early days, Cossacks had settled in the town, though their numbers declined over time—from 4,500 Cossack households in 1616 to only 500 by 1622. Around this time, Chyhyryn emerged as the capital of a separate Starostwo. In 1637, Cossack rebels led by Pavlo Pavliuk captured the town, but they were soon defeated. In 1638, the Polish Sejm established the Chyhyryn Regiment of registered Cossacks, initially commanded by Jan Zakrzewski and later, in 1644, by Jan Krzeczowski.

=== Cossack capital ===
Map-scheme of the Chyhyryn fortress on the eve of the siege of 1678 I - Central bastion or "bulwark" of the New Castle II - Bastion ("dungeon") of Doroshenko III - Bastion with the Crimean Tower IV - The Spassky Gate with a wooden tower and a double ravelin in front of them V - Wooden tower on a stone foundation, "New Goat Horn" VI - Tower and the well VII - Stone corner bastion VIII - Stone round tower IX - The Kyiv Tower with a gate to the bridge X - Noname tower (just built in 1678) XI - The Korsun or Mill Tower XII - Gate to the Lower Town

After the defeat of the Crown forces in battles against the Cossack rebels led by Bohdan Khmelnytsky, Chyhyryn came under his control and was chosen by him as his main seat of power. The town was transformed into the principal Cossack stronghold, and the Chyhyryn Regiment became the most prominent unit in the Zaporozhian Host, numbering 3,291 men. As a result of the Treaty of Zboriv, Chyhyryn Starostwo was granted to Khmelnytsky.

After the death of Khmelnytsky, two Cossack hetmans based in Chyhyryn recognized Polish suzerainty receiving the Chyhyryn Starostwo: Ivan Vyhovsky in 1658 and Yurii Khmelnytsky in 1660. Their successor, Pavlo Teteria, continued the policy of loyalty to Poland. In 1663, Chyhyryn was besieged by Kalmyk Tatars, and a year later it was attacked twice by Left-bank Cossacks under the command of Bryukhovetsky. The fortress was not captured, but a large part of the town was burned down.

After Teteria resigned from the hetmancy in 1665, Chyhyryn briefly remained in Polish hands, but was soon taken by the new hetman, Petro Doroshenko, who acknowledged Turkish protection while not formally breaking ties with Poland. This became one of the causes of the Polish-Turkish war. Turkey took control of Right-bank Ukraine, granting Doroshenko a small principality in the southern part of the Kyiv region with its capital in Chyhyryn. However, the land was completely devastated — people fled or were expelled, and Chyhyryn itself became a Tatar slave market.

In 1676, the city was besieged by Russian-Cossack forces, and Doroshenko was forced to surrender and swear allegiance to the Tsar. The hetman’s insignia were taken to Moscow. Meanwhile, the Turks proclaimed the freed Yurii Khmelnytsky as the new Cossack hetman and, in his name, led a large army into Ukraine. The Turkish siege of Chyhyryn in August 1677 was repelled by the Russians, but another siege a year later, led by Kara Mustafa, ended in success. The Turks completely destroyed the city and dismantled the fortress. Under the terms of the 1686 Polish-Russian treaty, the strip of land from Stayki to mouth of Tiasmyn was to remain uninhabited, so the city was not rebuilt.

=== Later history ===
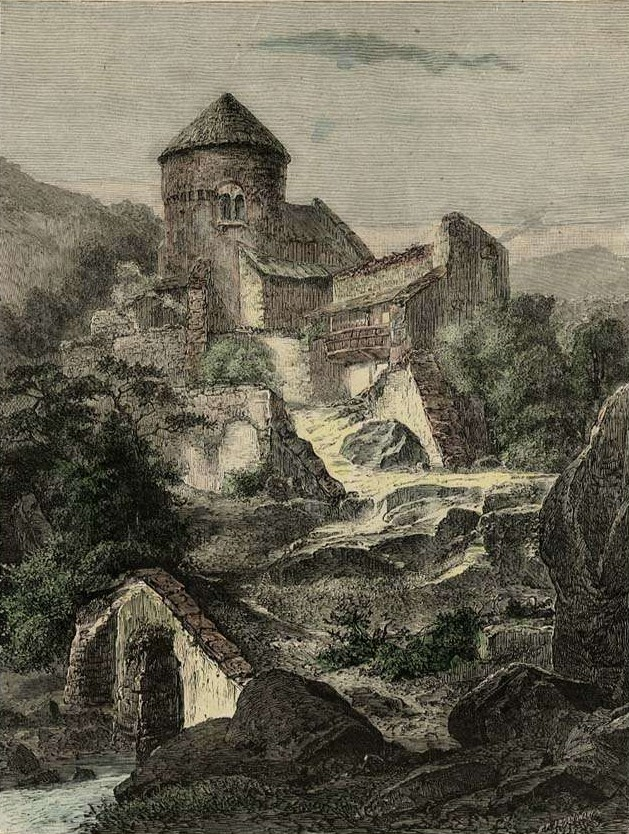
Remnants of fortification walls in 19th century (not preserved)

Soon, however, people began returning to these lands, especially after peace was finally established between Poland, Turkey, and Russia in 1714, confirming Polish rule over the Right Bank. It remained the center of the Chyhyryn Regiment until 1712. In 1708, Andrii Doroshenko rebuilt the monastery that had been destroyed by the Turks. In 1720, the Church of the Exaltation of the Holy Cross was founded. The Starostwo of Chyhyryn was soon reinstated. As a border town, it was plagued by raids from haidamak bands or settlers from New Serbia. The castle was not rebuilt until around 1760. By 1765, the town had 108 houses. According to the 1789 census, there were 138 houses, three churches, and one monastery, though the castle had again been destroyed. In 1792, King Stanisław August renewed the town's privileges and granted new ones.

In 1790 the 8th Polish National Cavalry Brigade was stationed in Czehryń and in 1792 the 4th Polish Vanguard Regiment was stationed there. It was annexed by the Russian Empire in the Second Partition of Poland (1793), and became part of the Kyiv region.

In 1917 a congress of Free Cossacks took place in Chyhyryn. At that congress by tradition Pavlo Skoropadsky was elected as the Hetman of the Cossacks (later in 1918 in Kyiv, he was elected the Hetman of Ukraine as well). During the Ukrainian War of Independence, from 1917 to 1920, it passed between various factions, serving for several months as the capital of a self-proclaimed republic. Afterwards it was administratively part of the Kremenchuk Governorate of Ukraine, and after its dissolution of the Kyiv Governorate of Ukraine.

During World War II, Chyhyryn was occupied by the German Army from August 7, 1941 to December 12, 1943.

In 1989 the population of the city was 12,853.

Until 18 July 2020, Chyhyryn served as an administrative center of Chyhyryn Raion. The raion was abolished in July 2020 as part of the administrative reform of Ukraine, which reduced the number of raions of Cherkasy Oblast to four. The area of Chyhyryn Raion was merged into Cherkasy Raion.

The town hosts an unfinished Chyhyryn Nuclear Power Plant.

== Population ==
=== Language ===
Distribution of the population by native language according to the 2001 census:

Language	Percentage
Ukrainian	93.14%
Russian	5.37%
other/undecided	1.49%

== Geography ==
=== Location ===
The city is on the banks of Tiasmyn River and lies at an altitude of 124 metres above mean sea level. Minor industries, such as food and furniture factories, are the basis of the town economy in the 21st century.

=== Climate ===
Climate data for Chyhyryn (1981–2010)
Month	Jan	Feb	Mar	Apr	May	Jun	Jul	Aug	Sep	Oct	Nov	Dec	Year
Mean daily maximum °C (°F)	−0.9 (30.4)	−0.1 (31.8)	5.5 (41.9)	14.4 (57.9)	21.3 (70.3)	24.3 (75.7)	26.3 (79.3)	25.9 (78.6)	20.0 (68.0)	13.0 (55.4)	5.0 (41.0)	0.4 (32.7)	12.9 (55.2)
Daily mean °C (°F)	−3.5 (25.7)	−3.1 (26.4)	1.7 (35.1)	9.4 (48.9)	15.9 (60.6)	19.2 (66.6)	21.2 (70.2)	20.4 (68.7)	14.9 (58.8)	8.8 (47.8)	2.3 (36.1)	−2.1 (28.2)	8.8 (47.8)
Mean daily minimum °C (°F)	−6.1 (21.0)	−5.9 (21.4)	−1.5 (29.3)	4.8 (40.6)	10.4 (50.7)	14.3 (57.7)	16.1 (61.0)	15.0 (59.0)	10.4 (50.7)	5.4 (41.7)	−0.2 (31.6)	−4.4 (24.1)	4.9 (40.8)
Average precipitation mm (inches)	34.4 (1.35)	32.9 (1.30)	35.5 (1.40)	36.7 (1.44)	49.7 (1.96)	77.1 (3.04)	65.2 (2.57)	54.2 (2.13)	55.9 (2.20)	42.1 (1.66)	39.4 (1.55)	37.0 (1.46)	560.1 (22.05)
Average precipitation days (≥ 1.0 mm)	7.4	7.1	7.3	7.0	7.2	8.5	7.1	6.3	6.5	5.7	6.8	7.4	84.3
Average relative humidity (%)	83.5	80.8	76.6	66.9	63.2	68.0	68.0	66.4	71.9	76.9	84.0	85.1	74.3
Source: World Meteorological Organization

== Landmarks ==
The Trinity Monastery, built near Chyhyryn in 1627, was later destroyed by the Soviet authorities. Other historical landmarks, such as the town hall and Khmelnytsky's palace, did not survive either. After Ukraine regained independence, Hetman's residence was restored and became a museum.

== Notable people ==
- Georgy Danilov, linguist
- Bohdan Khmelnytsky, hetman
- Kateryna Yushchenko, scientist

== International relations ==
=== Twin towns — Sister cities ===
Chyhyryn is twinned with:

City	Country	Year of Signing
Sebastopol, California	United States	1993

== Gallery ==
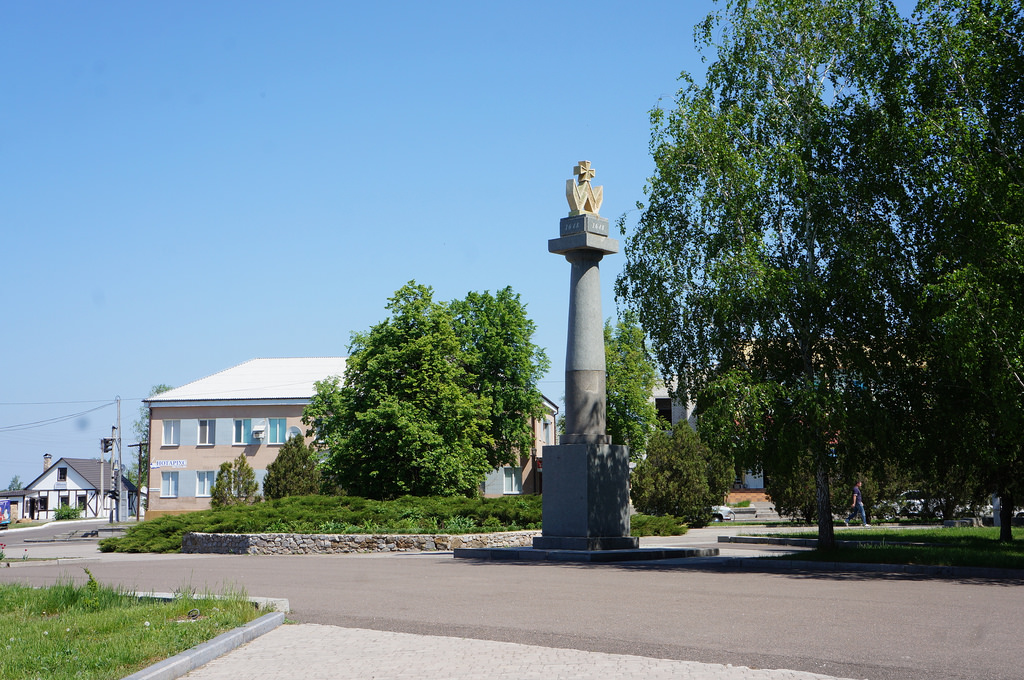
Main square of Chyhyryn

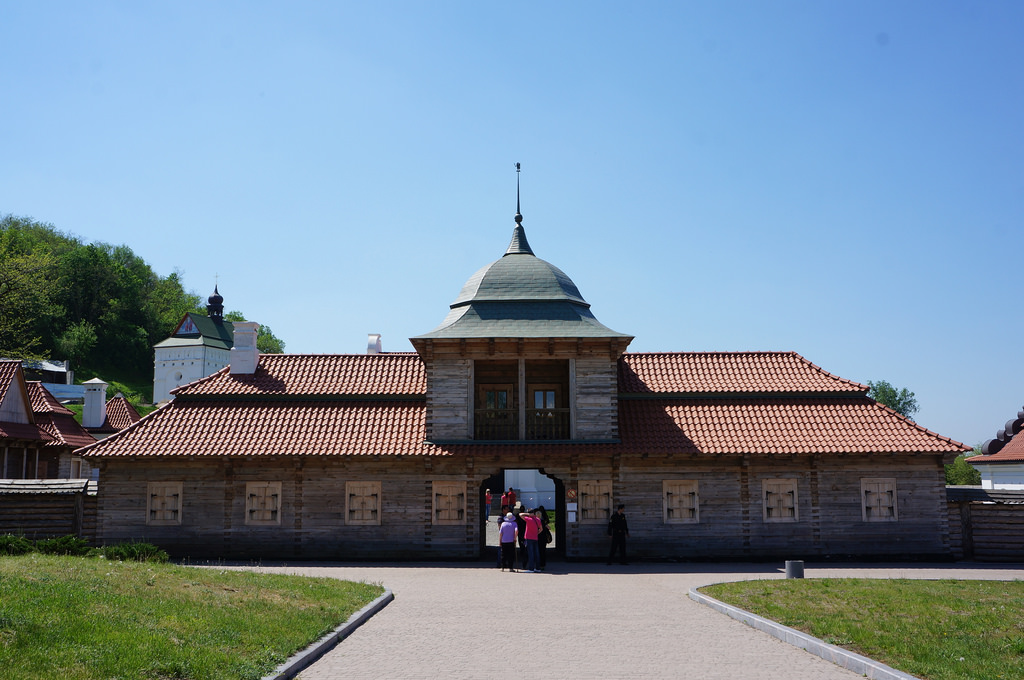
Entrance of the restored Bohdan Khmelnytskyi residence

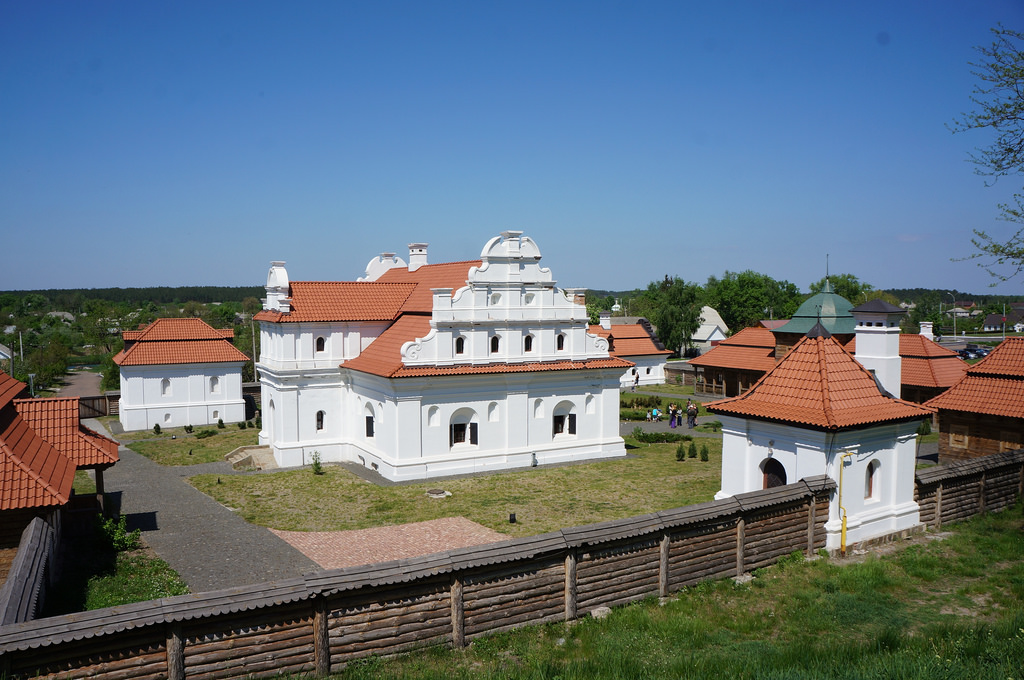
Bohdan Khmelnytskyi residence

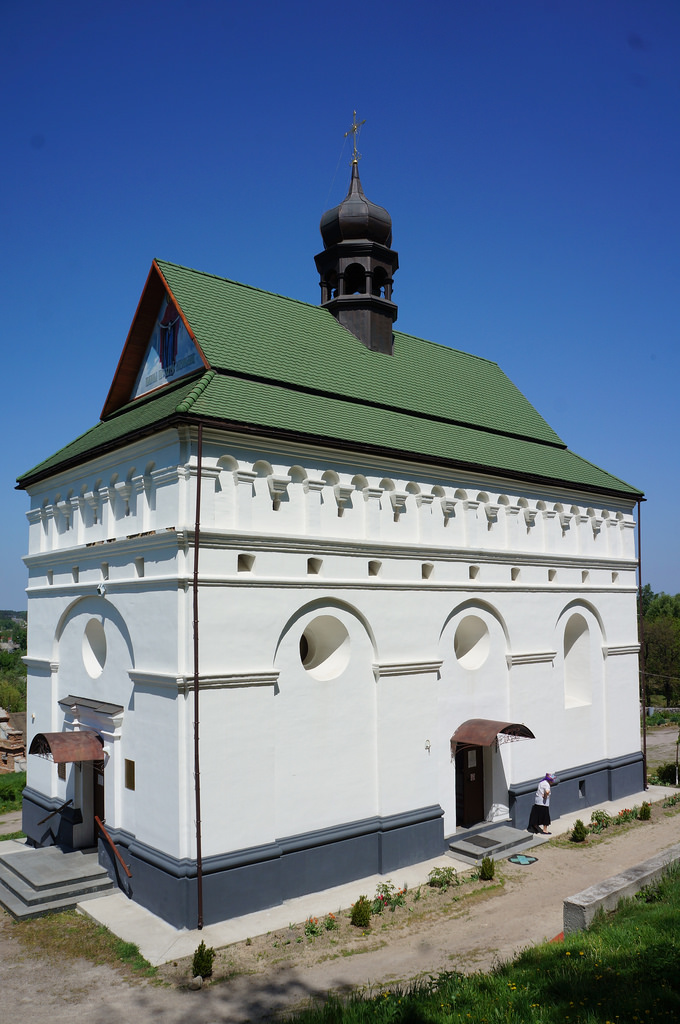
St. Peter and St. Paul Church in Chyhyryn

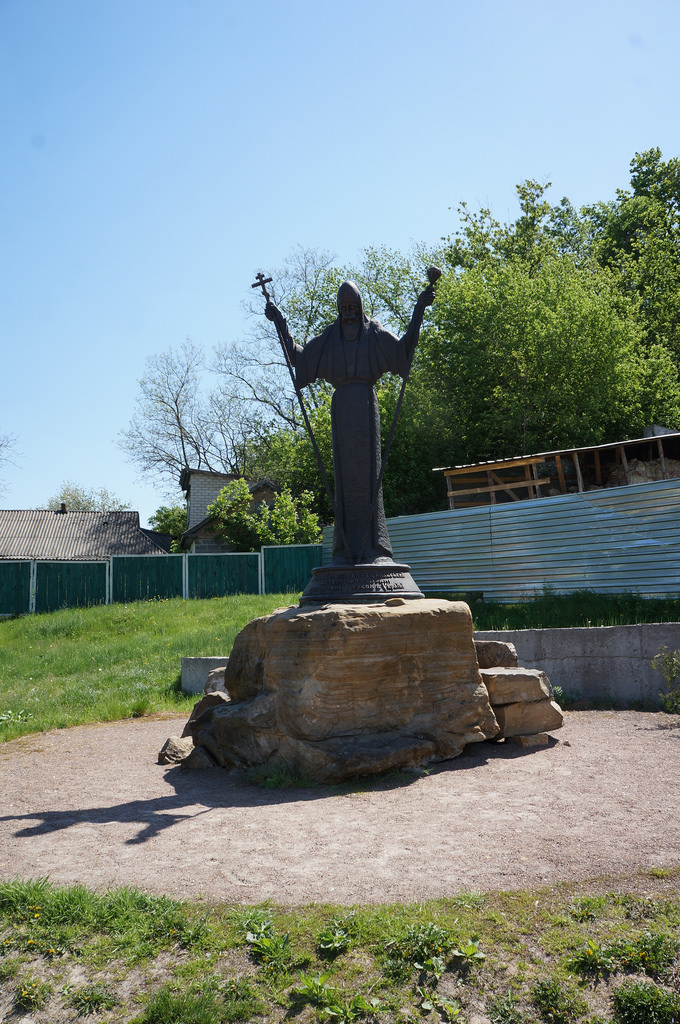
A statue near the church

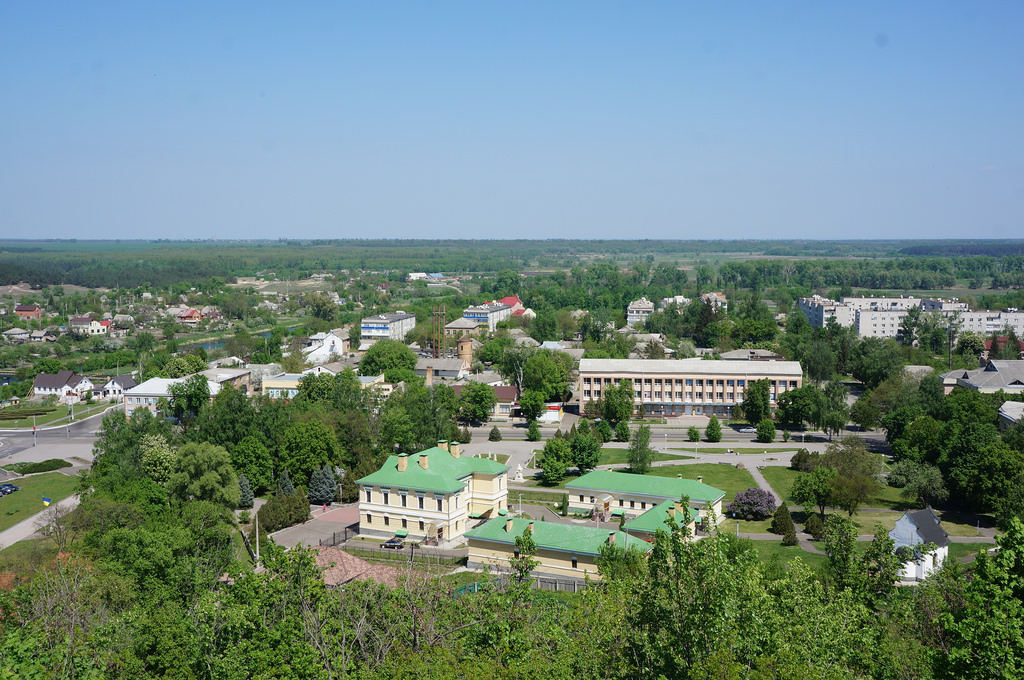
View of Chyhyryn from the city's Castle Hill

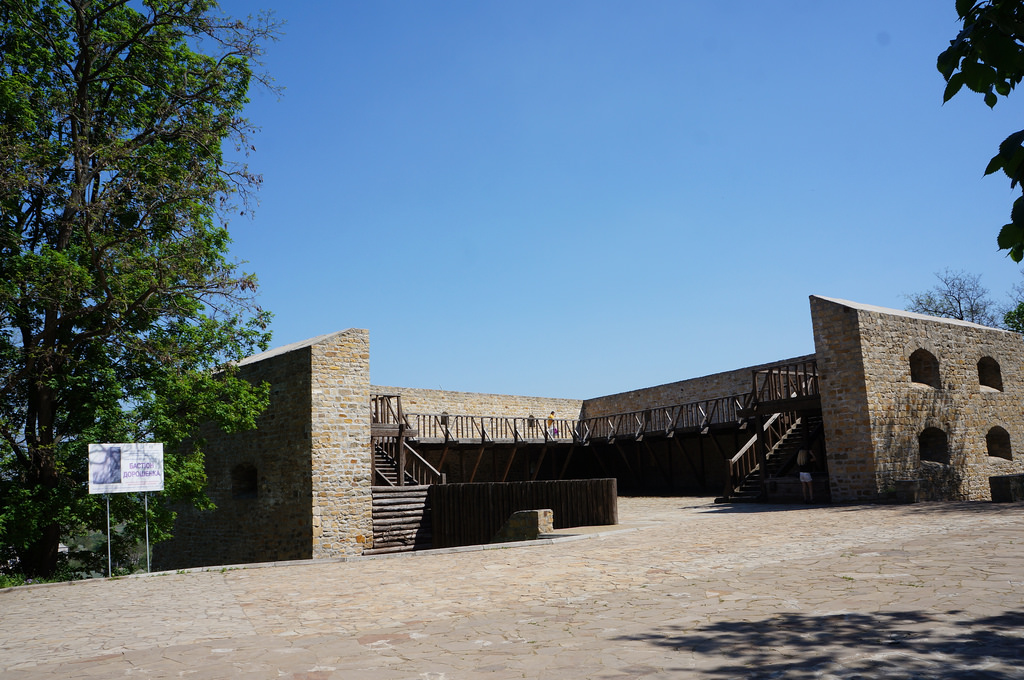
Remnants of Chyhyryn Fortress on the Castle Hill (reconstructed)

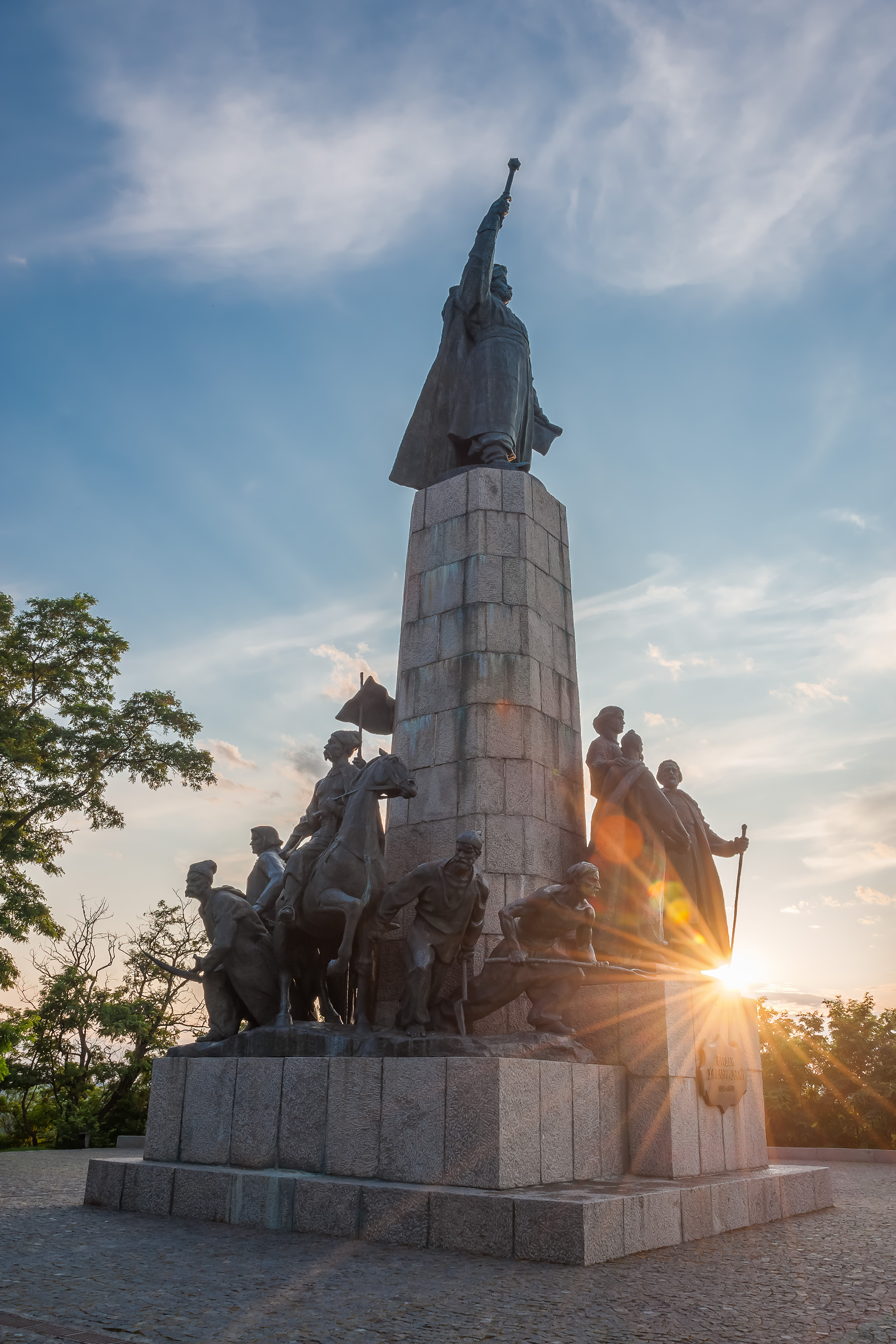
Bohdan Khmelnytskyi monument in Chyhyryn

== See also ==
- Perevolochna, former fortress on Dnieper
