= Battle of Zhovnyn =

1638 battle

- Part of Ostryanyn Uprising
Date	13 June – 7 August 1638
Location	Zhovnyn, in modern Cherkasy Oblast, Ukraine
Result	Polish–Lithuanian victory

Belligerents
Polish–Lithuanian Commonwealth	insurgent Cossacks

Commanders and leaders
Jeremi Wiśniowiecki; Mikołaj Potocki; Stanisław Potocki	Yakiv Ostryanyn; Dmytro Hunia; Skidan, Filonenko

Strength
est. 8,000 infantry 12 artillery	est. 16,000 infantry 8 artillery

Casualties and losses
Unknown, have been described as significant	Unknown, have been described as significant

The Battle of Zhovnyn was an engagement between the Polish–Lithuanian Commonwealth forces under hetman Mikołaj Potocki, supported by the forces under magnate Jeremi Wiśniowiecki, and Cossacks commanded by Yakiv Ostryanyn (Polish: Jakub Ostrzanin) and Dmytro Hunia during the Ostryanyn Uprising in Summer 1638. After a prolonged siege, the Cossacks were defeated and surrendered to the Commonwealth forces.

== Background ==
The unrest in Ukraine among Cossacks remained high following the defeat of the Pavlyuk Uprising in 1637. After the uprising, the Sejm passed a law setting the number of registered Cossacks at 6,000, and declaring all others peasants. This led to a new mobilization of Cossacks, this time led by Yakiv Ostryanyn, Dmytro Hunia and Karpo Skidan.

== Battle ==
After several smaller battles, the Commonwealth forces under Prince Jeremi Wiśniowiecki caught up with the Cossack force under Ostryanyn and Hunia near Zhovnyn on the morning of 13 June. Wiśniowiecki decided to attack the Cossacks as soon as possible to prevent them from building a tabor fortification. He was soon reinforced by most of the Commonwealth army under regimentarz Stanisław Potocki. The Poles deployed their infantry and artillery in the center, and the cavalry on the flanks, with the right flank under Wiśniowiecki, and the left under Potocki. Wiśniowiecki was able to break through the Cossack defenses, but Potocki fared less well, and Wiśniowiecki found himself surrounded after breaching the Cossack fortifications. After three charges, which he led personally, and in one which he lost a horse, Wiśniowiecki succeeded in breaking back through the Cossack fortifications and returning to the Polish camp that evening. Nonetheless, Wiśniowiecki's charge was enough for some Cossacks, including Ostryanyn, to abandon the camp and run away; the Cossacks would elect a new leader, Dmytro Hunia.

On the morning on the next day, Wiśniowiecki led an infantry assault. The Cossacks, expecting reinforcement, had begun negotiations, which, however, broke down quickly. In the meantime, Cossack reinforcements under Karpo Skidan fared less well, losing some skirmishes. In the end, only a part of them broke through to the Cossack camp, and Skidan himself would be captured during the assault on 16 June.

The siege dragged on, as the Cossack fort was well built, and the besieging forces failed to prevent small parties of reinforcements from relieving the Cossacks. The Polish forces were also lacking in infantry and ammunition for the artillery. Before Polish reinforcements under Hetman Mikołaj Potocki arrived around 21 June, the Cossacks under Hunia succeeded in building a bridge in the night and moving the entire camp to a new location nearby. Potocki arrived soon after the Cossacks finished their relocation, on the 22nd. It would be a week before the Polish forces were reinforced by the much-needed artillery. Despite the artillery support, a new assault on 10 July failed to take the camp.

The Commonwealth forces decided to wait for the Cossacks to run out of supplies. In the meantime, on the night of 22 to 23 July, a few dozen Cossacks managed to sneak into the Polish camp, kill a number of artillery personnel, and almost succeed in wrecking the entire artillery section. Meanwhile, another Cossack leader, Filonienko, attempted to relieve the camp, bringing much needed supplies. On 4 August, two battles took place: another assault on the camp, and a battle against the Cossack reinforcements. To bypass the Polish cordon, Filonenko used river boats (czajki) to approach the camp. Hunia attempted to aid Filonienko with a counterattack outside the camp, and the forces clashed outside the walls of the Cossack camp in a battle that lasted the entire day. Eventually Filonienko made it to the camp, but with only a few hundred troops, and without any supplies. That night, Hunia escaped from the camp, seeking asylum in Muscovy.

== Aftermath ==
Abandoned by their leader, the Cossacks entered negotiations on 7 August and surrendered soon afterward.
