= Samuel Łaszcz =

Polish noble (1588–1649)

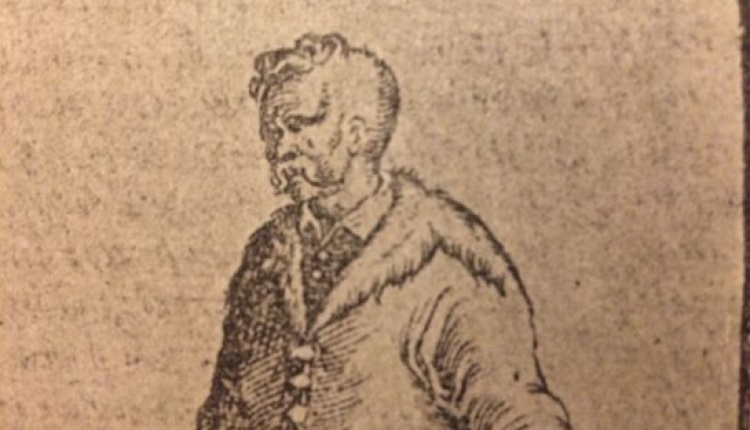
The "Łaszczówka", a style of men's haircut which is alleged to have been introduced by Samuel Łaszcz

Samuel Łaszcz (1588–1649), of the Prawdzic Coat of Arms, was a famous nobleman in the Polish–Lithuanian Commonwealth, with a family estate in Laszczów. He held the positions of Starosta of Owrucz, Crown Grand Standard-bearer, and Crown Great Guard (praefectus excubiarum seu vigiliarum). He served as a military commander and was given the nom de guerre "zagończyk" (brave raider), but later became infamous as an outlaw. He was known for his smile and quick wit, and allegedly introduced a traditional Polish haircut which bears his name.

== Military career ==
Łaszcz is alleged to have started his military career at the age of 17, serving under the famous commander Stefan Chmielecki, with whom he practiced his military skills in the Dzikie Pola. He took part in the Khotyn campaign (1621) and fought later in 1633 against Mehmed Abazi Pasha during the Polish–Ottoman War (1633–34), during which fame of his bravery grew. He fought during the Swedish invasion of 1626-29, and in numerous other battles against the Crimean Tatars (e.g. 1624, 1629), the rebellious Commonwealth Zaporozhian Cossacks, (e.g. at the Battle of Kumeyki in 1637), and during the Khmelnytsky Uprising. He was known as strach tatarski (Tatar terror) and considered a successful commander.

Before the Battle of Kumeyki, he brought 500 horsemen and 300 infantry to the army lines. During the campaign, field hetman Mikołaj Potocki ordered Łaszcz's command to provoke the Cossacks to abandon their positions and pursue him. Łaszcz successfully carried out his orders, helping to bring about victory over the more numerous rebels. In 1638, he led his own command against the Cossacks and gained even greater military fame.

== Life as an outlaw ==
Łaszcz and his company pillaged, robbed and raped victims across various noble estates, including peasants, merchants and many others, in the Commonwealth provinces of Ukraine, Red Ruthenia, Volhynia, and Podolia. He received 236 sentences of exile (banicja) and 37 sentences of infamy (infamia). He is rumoured to have sewn them into his coat (delia). He fought with Prince Jeremi Wiśniowiecki. He was protected from the law by the patronage of hetman Stanisław Koniecpolski, because Koniecpolski admired the fact that Łaszcz, an able soldier and commander, could always be counted on to fight for the Commonwealth in times of war. From a legal point of view, as a professional soldier, Łaszcz was subject to military, not civil, jurisdiction. He was therefore able to enjoy the protection that Koniecpolski's status as a hetman offered him. However, when Koniecpolski died, Łaszcz was attacked at his estates by Prince Wiśniowiecki, being forced to escape and became a true outlaw, without a home or money. He was stripped of his offices and titles, finally relying on Prince Władysław Dominik Zasławski to offer him refuge. Prior to his expulsion by Prince Wiśniowiecki, his headquarters were in Makarów (Makarov) in Ukraine; after the lawful ousting by his enemies, he and his family were banished from their estates for the rest of their lives.

== Return and death ==
When the Khmelnytsky Uprising began in 1648, Łaszcz fought against the rebels as part of the Zasławski party. However, his enemy, Prince Wiśniowiecki, demanded that he leave the army camp, due to an event that took place before the Battle of Pyliavtsi. Łaszcz, having 1000 men at his command, had attacked the Cossacks' camp, causing alarm and fear. He left but later fought in the defence of Lwów, scoring some successes against the besieging Cossack army. The Polish lower parliamentary house (sejm) granted him a salvus conductus (safe conduct) in return for his military services; however, he only participated in the campaigns of 1648, before falling ill and dying on 15 February 1649. He was buried at the Saint Stephen Church in Kraków. The church was demolished in 1802; thus, Łaszcz's tomb has been lost.

== Family ==
The historian Szymon Okolski wrote in his Dyaryusz that Łaszcz's mother was from the house of Koraczewska. Łaszcz married twice and had a daughter and two sons.
