= Pavliuk uprising =

1637 rebellion in Ukraine

Date	1637–1638
Location	Ukraine
Result	Polish-Lithuanian victory

Belligerents
Polish–Lithuanian Commonwealth	Zaporozhian Cossacks

Commanders and leaders
Mikołaj Potocki; Sawa Kononowicz †; Jeremi Wiśniowiecki	Pavlo Pavliuk (executed); Dmytro Hunia; Karp Skydan

The Pavliuk uprising of 1637 was a Cossack uprising in Left-bank Ukraine and Zaporizhia headed by Pavlo Pavliuk against the abuses of the nobility and magnates of Polish–Lithuanian Commonwealth. The uprising was sparked by several Cossacks being expelled from the Cossack Registry. Pavliuk ordered the captured commanders of the Registered Cossacks to be executed and issued a declaration, in which he proclaimed a fight against the masters. Defeated by the forces of Mikołaj Potocki in the Battle of Kumeyki in 1637, Pavliuk was brought to Warsaw, tried and executed. The uprising was bloodily quelled, only to restart the following year in the form of the Ostrzanin Uprising, which was also defeated by the Commonwealth.

== History ==
It is unclear what sparked the rebellion. Most likely it was the social tension between the "Blacks", or poor peasants of the Right-Bank Ukraine, and mighty magnates like Jeremi Wiśniowiecki, who owned considerable wealth and lands in Ruthenia. Around that time local magnates tried to impose the system of pańszczyzna onto local plebeians, which increased tensions to record levels. Another reason for dissent was the number of Registered Cossacks on royal payroll, considered too small by many poor inhabitants of the region.

One of the leaders of the "Blacks", or poor peasants and non-registered Cossacks, Pavel Mikhnovych Pavliuk gathered a large band of armed Zaporozhian Cossacks and reached the fortress town of Korsuń, the headquarters of the Registered Cossacks and the largest Polish royal outpost in the Borderlands. Pavliuk had already taken part in the earlier Sulima Uprising of 1635, but was pardoned when he promised not to rise arms against the Commonwealth again.

He defeated the leader of the Registered Cossacks, Vasil Tumulenko, captured a large artillery park and proclaimed himself the new hetman of all Cossacks. He also issued a proclamation to "all Christians" urging them to join his ranks, exploiting all possible sources of dissent in the area, from religious differences, to the defence of "golden liberties", supposedly being violated by the szlachta. The new Cossack uprising was to be quelled by hetman Stanisław Koniecpolski, however his declining health made the king offer the bulawa to hetman Mikołaj Potocki instead.

On 3 July 1637 Pavliuk arrived at Kaniów, where he tried to convince the remaining leaders of the Registered Cossacks to betray their loyalty to the king of Poland and fight with him for an autonomous Cossack state between Kiev and Bila Tserkva. However, the Cossack leaders remained sceptical and most remained loyal to the Commonwealth. Unable to convince the well-trained and well-equipped Registered Cossacks to join him, Pavliuk also dispatched emissaries to Alexis I, tsar of Muscovy and to İnayet Giray, the Khan of Crimea. His efforts at securing outside help proved equally unsuccessful.

Eventually the forces of the Crown of Poland under Mikołaj Potocki entered Ukraine and joined with the Registered Cossacks. On 16 December 1637 the combined force attacked the Cossacks at Kumeyki near Cherkassy, in what became known as the battle of Kumeyki. Inexperienced Cossacks overextended their wagon fort and their lines were easily pierced by experienced soldiers such as Samuel Łaszcz. The battle, while disastrous for the Registered Cossacks who were killed almost to the last man, was victorious for the Polish side and the Cossacks retreated in disarray, while Pavlyuk was captured.

The remaining bands of armed Cossacks were soon defeated and "pushed back into the holes they crawled from", as one contemporary author put it. The remnants of the Cossack forces capitulated on 24 December 1637 in the town of Borowica, between the Dnieper and Taśmina Rivers. The Polish commander in chief gave his word to the defeated Cossacks that both ordinary soldiers and their leader would be spared. In return, the Cossacks surrendered their arms and their remaining leaders. Bohdan Khmelnytsky signed the agreement in the name of the Cossacks. He would lead the largest Cossack uprising against the Commonwealth 11 years later.

== Aftermath ==
The agreement at Borowica was soon broken by both sides. Pavliuk was soon afterwards brought to Warsaw, tried by the king and executed for high treason. The Cossacks rebelled again the following spring. The uprising was bloodily quelled, and the Rebellion of Ostrzanin and Hunia the following summer was drowned in blood as well.

The Pavliuk Uprising, while often framed as a military conflict, possessed a pronounced dimension of social and religious rebellion. The insurgents, primarily Orthodox peasants and registered Cossacks, framed their struggle not only against Polish magnates but also against the increasing influence of the Catholic Church and the imposition of the Uniate faith, which they viewed as a tool of Polonization.

== Consequences ==
Many rebels, fleeing bloody reprisals, moved to the Muscovite state, particularly to the Don region. Pavlyuk, who had been taken prisoner, was executed in Warsaw.

The war continued with mixed fortunes into the following year, 1638. It ultimately ended in defeat for the Cossacks. However, these events served as a sort of dress rehearsal for the victorious liberation war of 1648–1654 led by Bohdan Khmelnytsky (who, at the time of the Battle of Kumeiki, was the scribe of the Zaporizhian Host).

Dmytro Hunya, one of the Cossack leaders at the Battle of Kumeiki, became hetman the following year.

== See also ==
- Trakhtemyriv
