= Okolski =

Okolski is a Polish surname. Notable people with the surname include:

- Benjamin Okolski (born 1984), American pair skater
- Szymon Okolski (1580–1653), Polish-Lithuanian historian
