= Ostryanyn uprising =

1638 Cossack uprising against the Polish–Lithuanian Commonwealth

Ostryanyn uprising Повстання Острянина
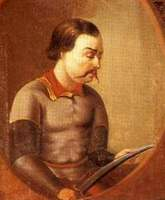
- Yakiv Ostryanyn
Date	1638
Location	Ukraine
Result	Polish-Lithuanian victory

Belligerents
Polish–Lithuanian Commonwealth	Zaporozhian Cossacks

Commanders and leaders
Mikołaj Potocki; Jeremi Wiśniowiecki; Stanisław Potocki	Yakiv Ostryanyn; Dmytro Hunia; Karp Skydan (executed)

The Ostryanyn uprising (Ukrainian: Повстання Острянина) was a 1638 Cossack uprising against the Polish–Lithuanian Commonwealth. It was sparked by an act of the Sejm (legislature) passed the same year that declared that non-Registered Cossacks were equal to ordinary peasants in their rights, and hence were subjected to enserfment. The uprising was initially led by Cossack Hetman Yakiv Ostryanyn (Polish: Jakub Ostrzanin) but was eventually crushed.

== Course ==
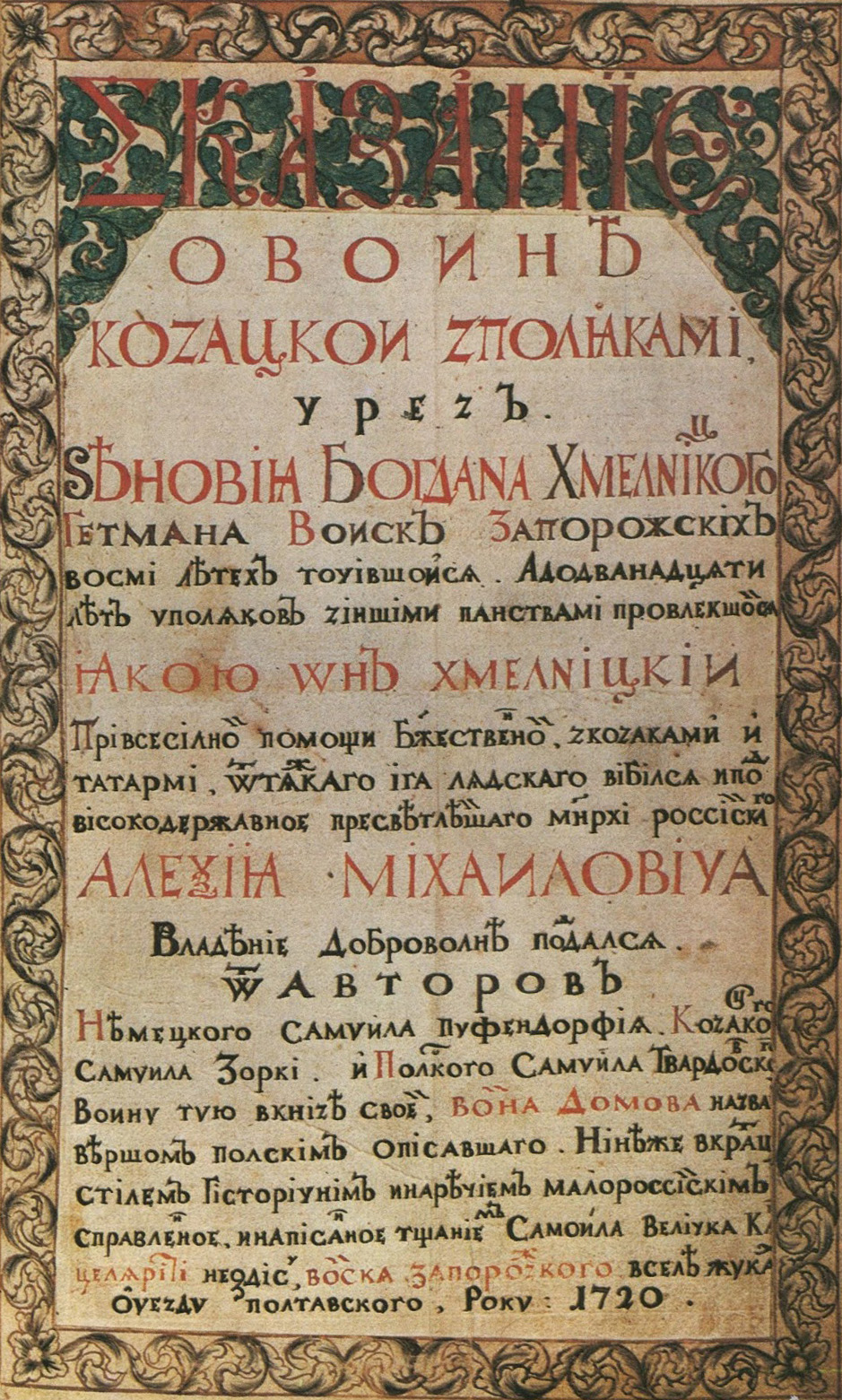
The Velychko chronicle, written in the Ruthenian (Old Ukrainian) language influenced by Old Church Slavonic, Polish and Latin.

According the Samiylo Velychko Chronicle, Ostryanyn, who had just been elected Hetman, issued an address to the Ruthenian people on the eve of the campaign in March 1638. He declared that he would "go with his army to the Ukraine in order to liberate the Orthodox people from the yoke of oppression and torment of the Polish tyranny and claim vengeance for grievances, ruin and torturous abuse... suffered by the entire Ruthenian populace, living on both sides of the Dnieper."

Ostryanyn also called on the people of Ukraine to join the insurgency and to beware of the Registered Cossacks. His leaflets were spread across Ukraine, reaching as far as Pokuttya. His appeal was carried and distributed by the Cossack elders, bandurists, youth, and according to Ostryanyn, even Orthodox monks. People began to prepare for an uprising, some going to Zaporozhye, while others sent food, money, and gunpowder.

The rebels left Zaporozhye and divided themselves into three detachments. The first, moving down the left bank of the Dnieper, was led by Ostryanyn himself. His force took Kremenchuk and moved on to Khorol and Omelnyk. The second body of troops, consisting of a flotilla led by Hunia, took the river crossings in Kremenchuk, Maksymivka, Buzhyn and Chyhyryn. The third force occupied the right bank of the Dnieper.

== Defeat ==
Ostryanyn's force was defeated at the Battle of Zhovnyn, near Zhovnyn in the Kiev Voivodeship. Subsequently, the Cossacks elected a new Hetman in the person of Dmytro Hunia. However, soon the uprising was quelled by Polish–Lithuanian forces led by Jeremi Wiśniowiecki and Mikołaj Potocki. After a series of further skirmishes, the Cossacks capitulated at the Starzec river. Hunia and some other Cossacks managed to flee to the Tsardom of Muscovy (see Chuhuiv).

== In literature ==
The uprising was described in detail by Szymon Okolski, a well-known Polish historian, theologian, and specialist in heraldry. He witnessed and directly participated in the uprisings, and his field diaries became a valuable information source for historians and novelists.

The uprising forms part of the plot of the romanticized historical novel Taras Bulba, written in 1834 by Nikolai Gogol, a Ukrainian-born Russian dramatist and novelist. The book tells the story of an old Zaporozhian Cossack, Taras Bulba, and his two sons, Andriy and Ostap. The three men set out on an epic journey to join other Cossacks and participate in the Zaporozhia Cossack uprisings including the Ostryanyn Uprising.
