= Chuhuiv air base attack =

Missile attack during the Russian invasion of Ukraine

Chuhuiv Air Base attack
- Part of Eastern Ukraine campaign of the Russian invasion of Ukraine
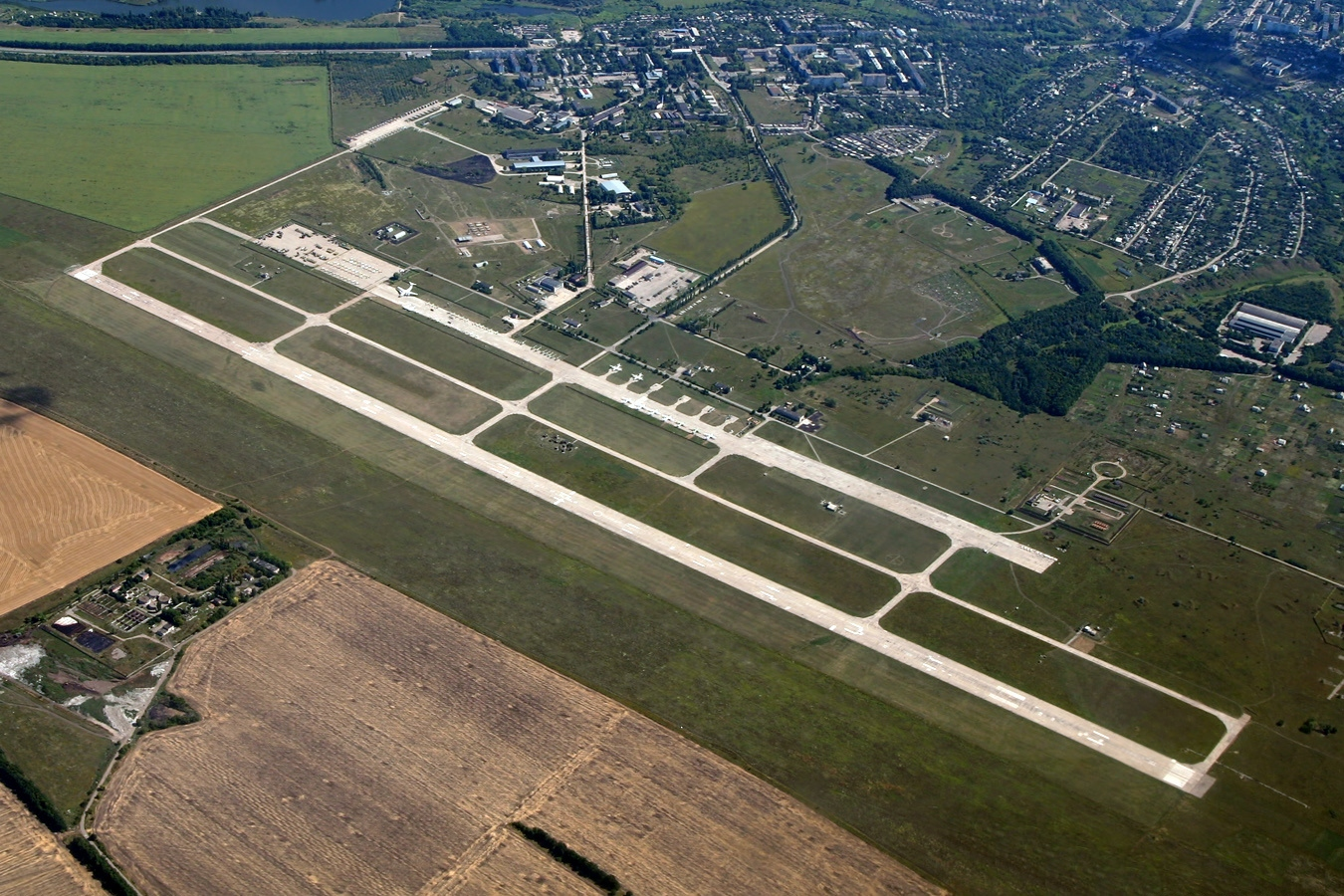
- Chuhuiv Air Base, in 2008
Date	24 February 2022
Location	Chuhuiv, Chuhuiv Raion, Kharkiv Oblast, Ukraine 49°50′24″N 036°38′50″E
Result	Russian victory: Aircraft, fuel tanks and infrastructure destroyed

Belligerents
Ukraine	Russia

Units involved
Armed Forces of Ukraine	Russian Armed Forces

Casualties and losses
6 L-39 attack trainers destroyed or damaged 1 MiG-29 destroyed 4 Bayraktar TB-2 drones destroyed	None
- Location within Ukraine Chuhuiv air base attack (Kharkiv Oblast)

On 24 February 2022, the Chuhuiv Air Base in Chuhuiv, Kharkiv Oblast, Ukraine was the target of an air strike by Russian forces as part of the eastern Ukraine offensive during the Russian invasion of Ukraine.

== Background ==
The Chuhuiv air base is located in the city of Chuhuiv in Kharkiv Oblast in Ukraine. The air base was capable of housing Baykar Bayraktar TB2 drones, as did the military airfields in Starokostyantyniv and Mykolaiv.

== Attack ==
In the opening hours of the Russian military invasion of Ukraine, a Russian missile attack targeted the Chuhuiv air base. Following the attack, the US-based space technologies' company Maxar published satellite images depicting damage resulting from the missile strike. According to open-source intelligence information, the attack left damage to fuel storage areas and other airport infrastructure. Also, at least six L-39 jet trainers, parked at the air base, were either destroyed or heavily damaged. One MiG-29 crashed as well. Four Bayraktar TB2 drones were abandoned at the base and later destroyed on the ground by Ukrainian forces, amid reported Russian rocket attacks.

== Later attacks ==
On 10 April 2022, Russian officials claimed their forces targeted Ukrainian S-300 air defences present at Chuhuiv airbase.
