= Chuhuiv =

City in Kharkiv Oblast, Ukraine

Chuhuiv Чугуїв
- City
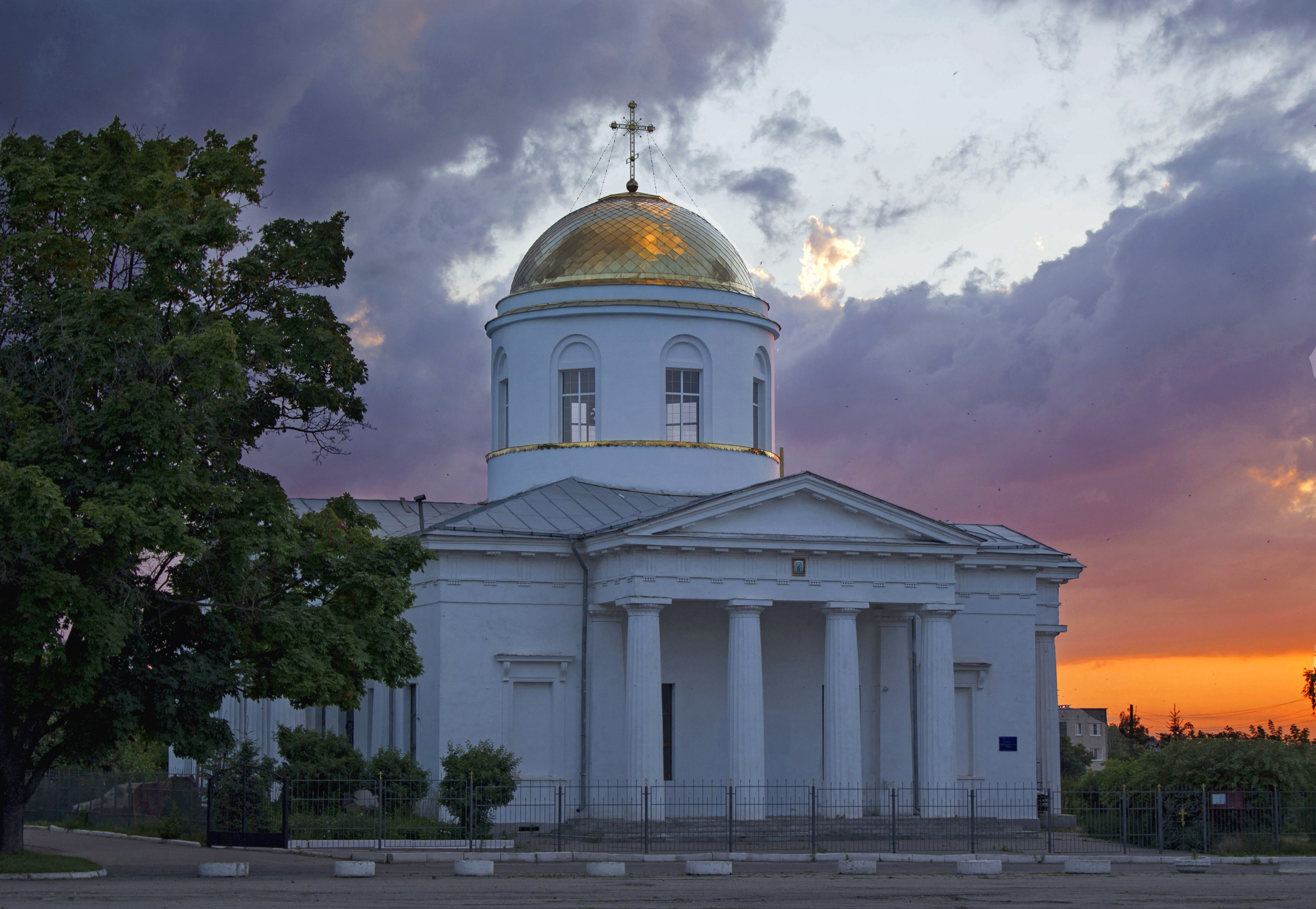
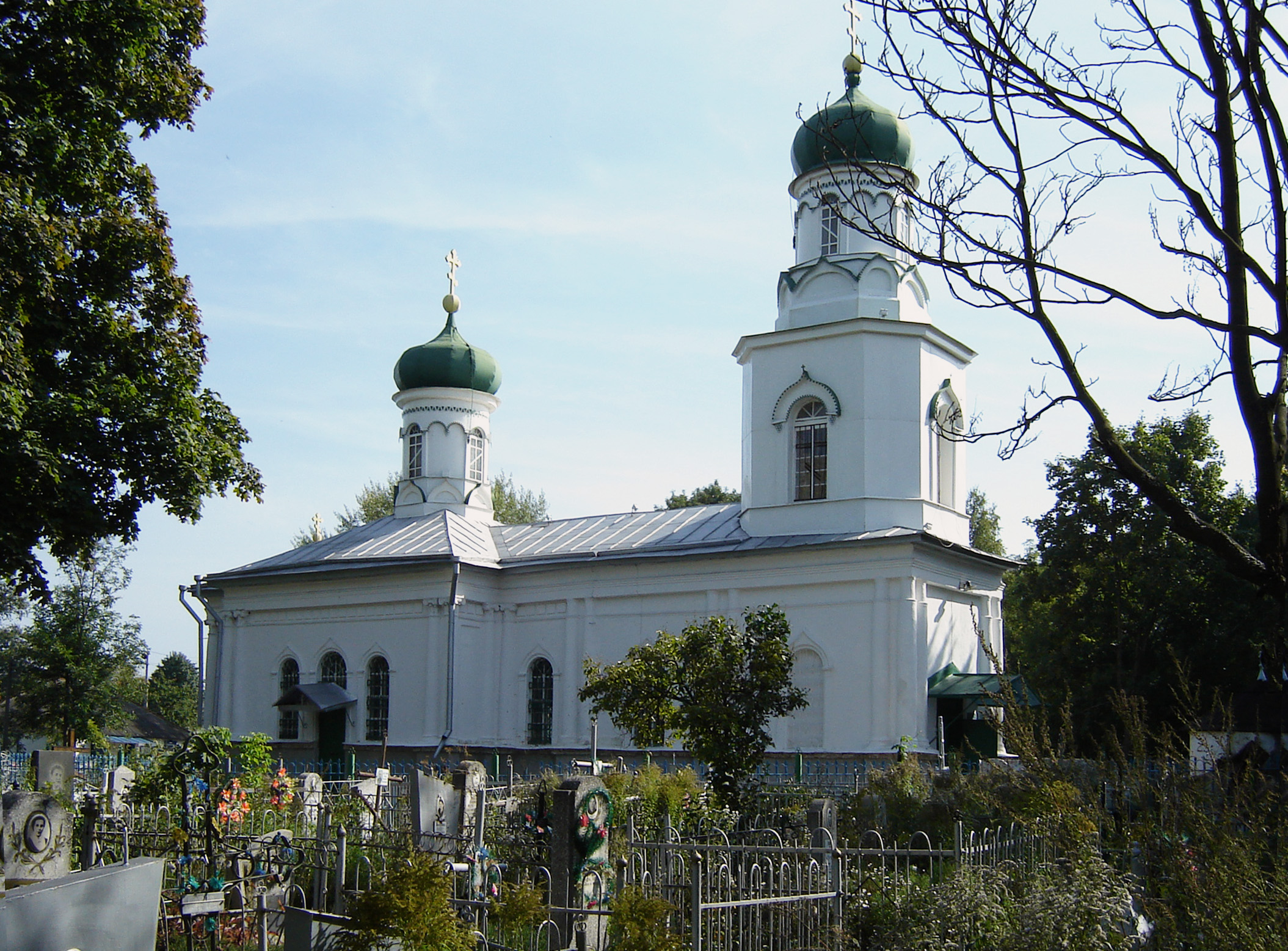
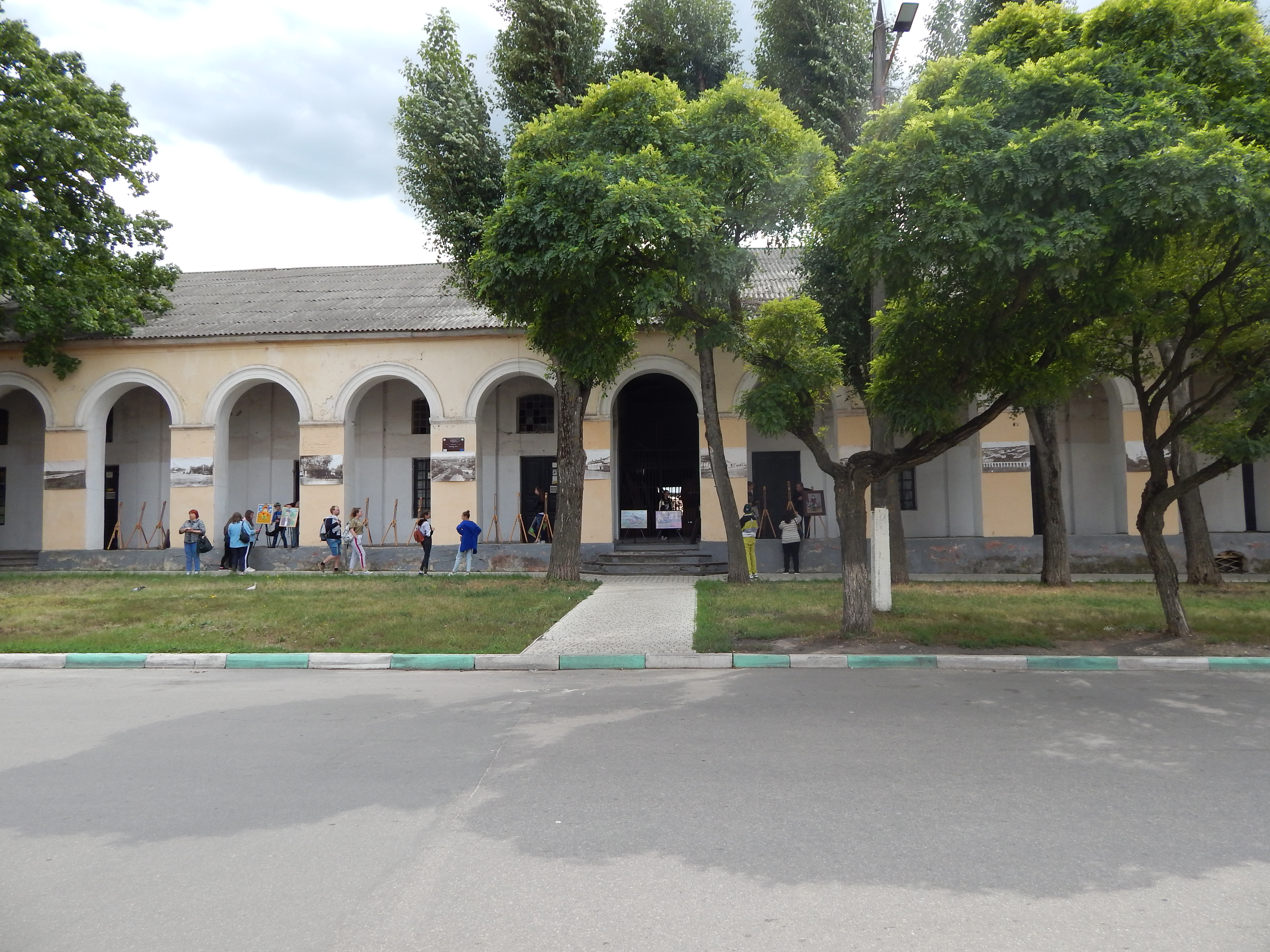

- Flag Coat of arms
- Interactive map of Chuhuiv
- Location within Kharkiv Oblast Location within Ukraine
- Coordinates: 49°50′8″N 36°41′11″E
- Country: Ukraine
- Oblast: Kharkiv Oblast
- Raion: Chuhuiv Raion
- Hromada: Chuhuiv urban hromada
- Founded: 1638

Area
  - Total: 12.77 km^{2} (4.93 sq mi)

Population (2022)
  - Total: 31,018
  - Density: 2,429/km^{2} (6,291/sq mi)
- Time zone: UTC+2 (EET)
  - Summer (DST): UTC+3 (EEST)
- Postal code: 63500—63509
- Website: http://chuguev-rada.gov.ua/

Chuhuiv (Ukrainian: Чугуїв, IPA: [t͡ʃʊˈɦujiu̯]) or Chuguyev (Russian: Чугуев) is a city in Kharkiv Oblast, Ukraine. The city is the administrative center of Chuhuiv Raion (district). It hosts the administration of Chuhuiv urban hromada, one of the hromadas of Ukraine. As of February 2024, according to the city council, more than 30,000 people live in Chuhuiv.

Chuhuiv's food industry focuses on producing mayonnaise along with other staple supporting condiments.

== History ==
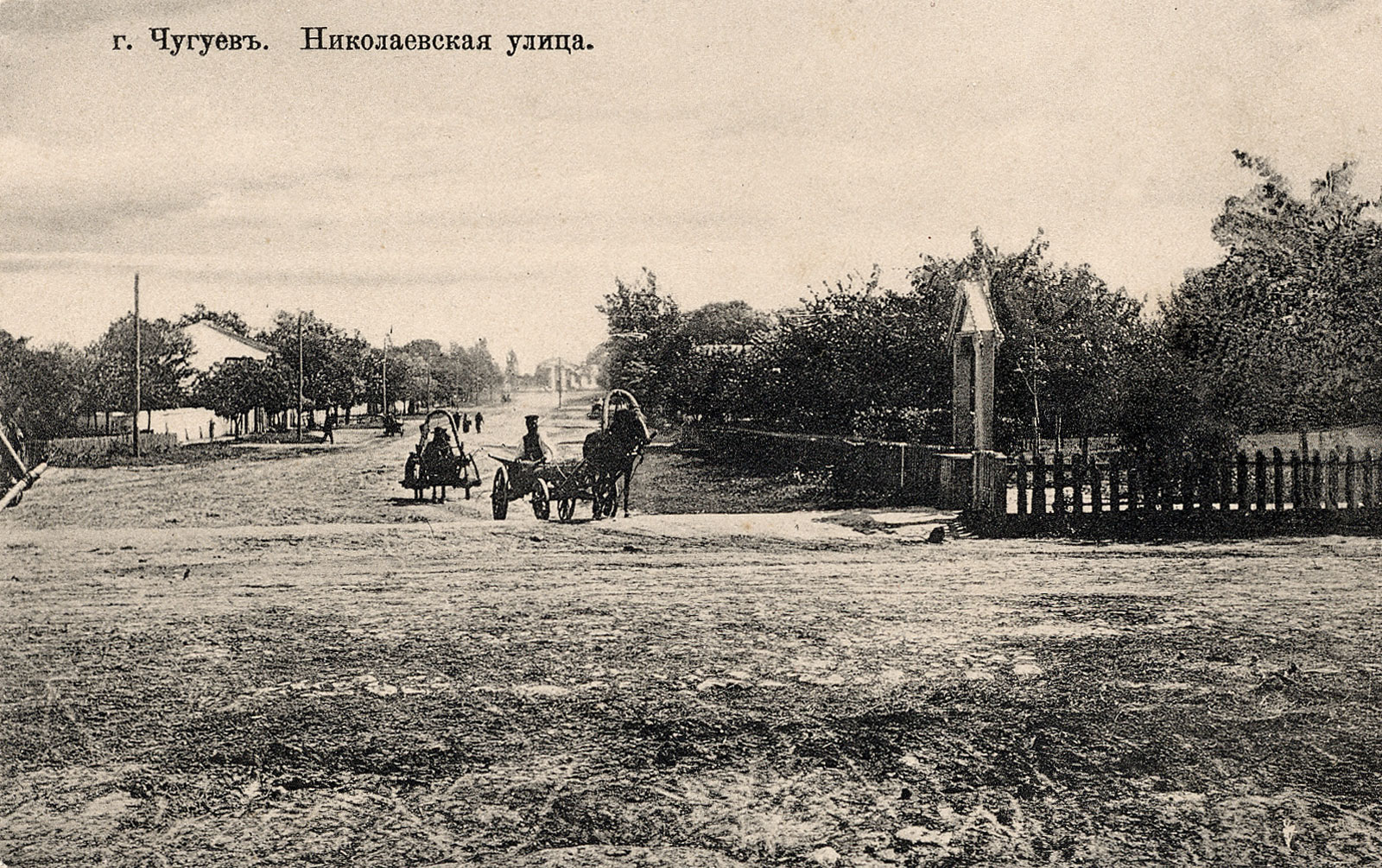
View of Chuhuiv around 1910

An early medieval town existed on the site from the 8th to at least the mid-10th century, and the hillfort there was known as Chuhuieve from the late 16th century, when attempts to build a fortress on it began. The town's founding is conventionally dated to 10 August 1638, when the Russian government allowed Cossacks led by Yakiv Ostryanyn, who had fled after the failed Ostryanyn uprising, to settle at the hillfort and build a fortress to guard the border.

A military fort was built adjacent to the city in 1638 by Ukrainian Cossacks of Yakiv Ostryanyn (see Ostryanyn uprising) on the order of Muscovite Tsar Mikhail Fedorovich. A military presence of some form near Chuhuiv has remained ever since. The Chuguev uprising of 1819 was a revolt of military settlers.

During the Ukrainian War of Independence, from 1917 to 1920, it passed between various factions. Afterwards it was administratively part of the Kharkiv Governorate of Ukraine.

During the government of the Soviet Union, the base became an important military training center. It has been home to the Soviet Air Force Pilot Academy and the Red Army's Artillery School. There is now a Ukrainian Air Force base adjacent to the town.

=== Military history ===
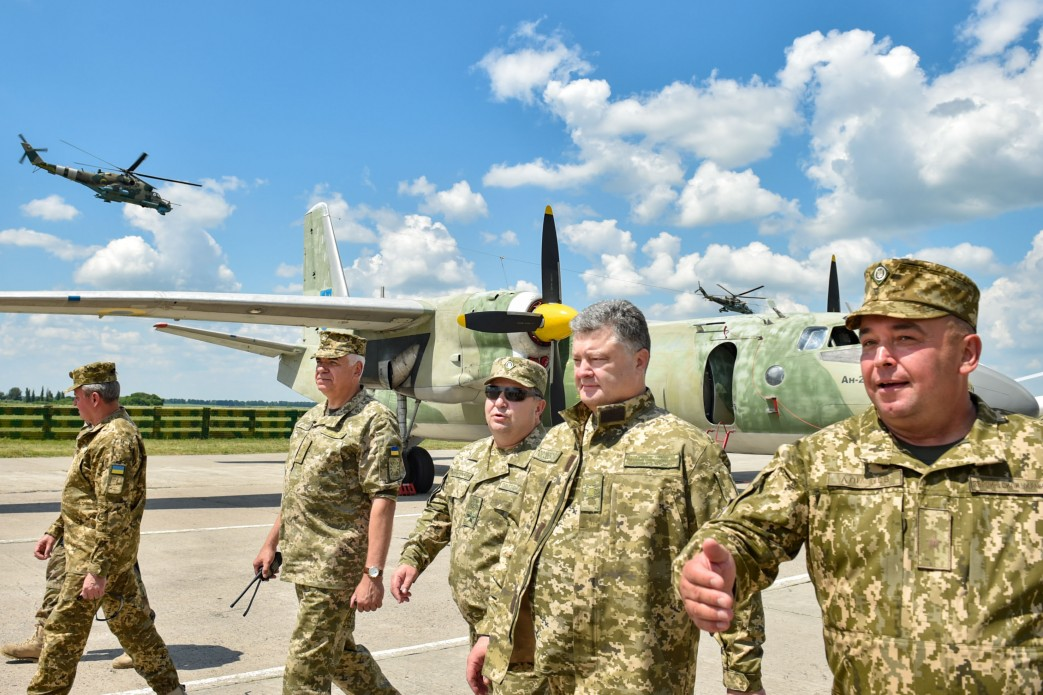
Petro Poroshenko at Chuhuiv Air Base, 2016

The city was the home of a major Soviet Air Force base and a military pilot's academy. There is now a Ukrainian Air Force base near the city.

Generally, the city has been an important military point since Cossack times. There was a Soviet Red Army Artillery School (a military academy) in Chuhuiv before World War II.

On 25 September 2020 an An-26 military plane with cadets of the Ivan Kozhedub National Air Force University crashed and caught fire near Chuhuiv. 26 people were killed and the sole survivor was seriously injured.

=== Present day ===
There are eight schools in Chuhuiv (grades 1–11), where several Peace Corps volunteers have served since 2004.

Until 18 July 2020, Chuhuiv was incorporated as a city of oblast significance and the center of Chuhuiv Municipality. The municipality was abolished in July 2020 as part of the administrative reform of Ukraine, which reduced the number of raions of Kharkiv Oblast to seven. The area of Chuhuiv Municipality was merged into Chuhuiv Raion.

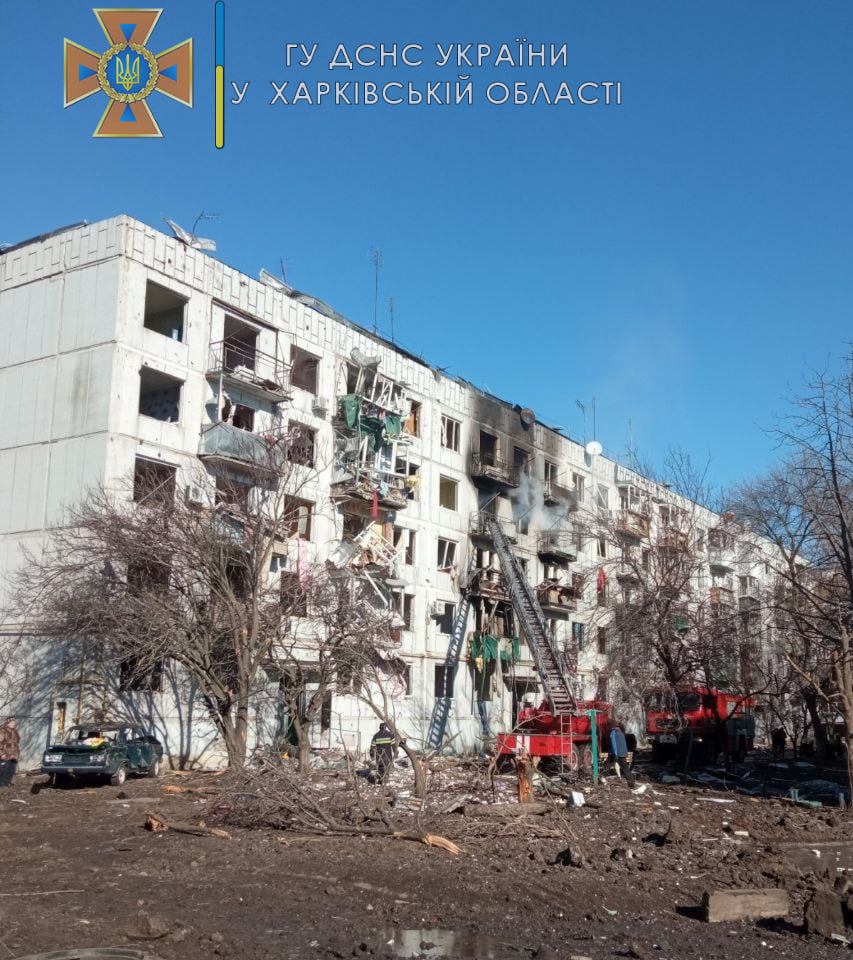
Residential building after Russian shelling on 24 February 2022

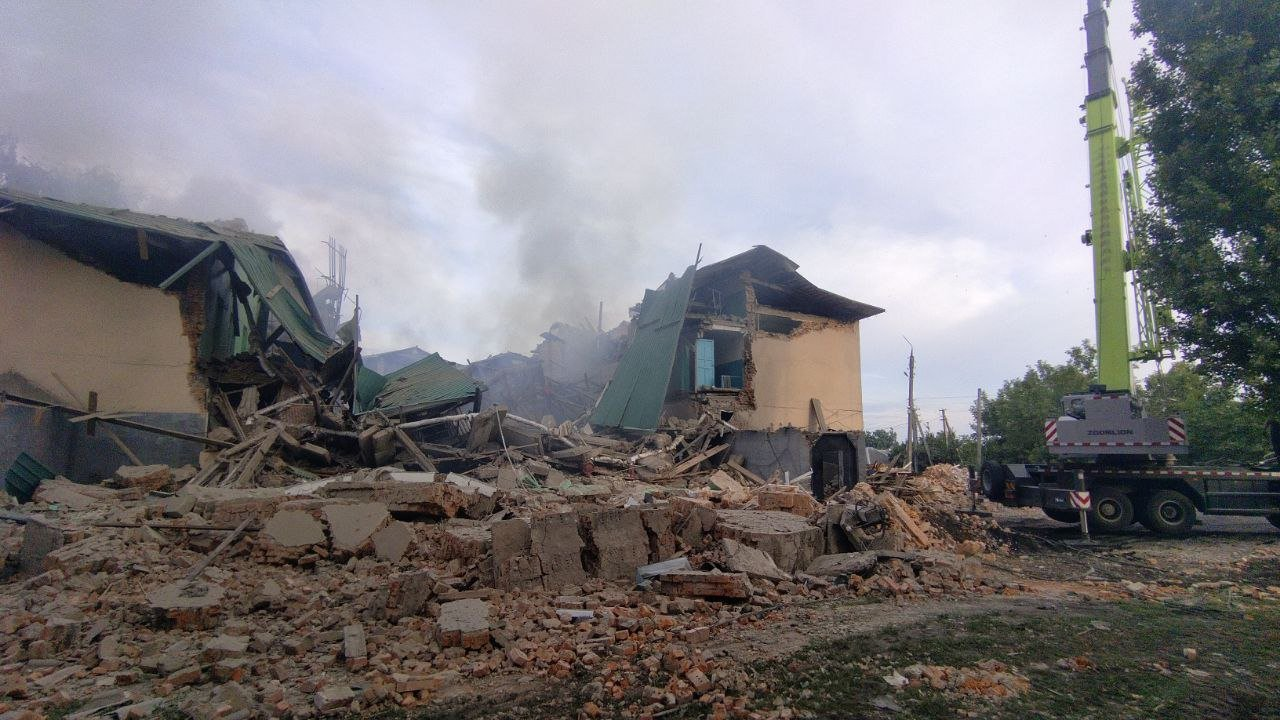
House of culture shelled on 25 July

As part of the Russian invasion of Ukraine, Chuhuiv was shelled by Russian forces on February 24, 2022. A 14-year-old boy was killed. On the same day, an air base near the city was attacked.

Russia partly captured the city in late February, being on the outskirts of it. On 7 March 2022, Ukrainian forces retook the city and reportedly inflicted heavy casualties on Russian forces, allegedly killing two high-ranking Russian officers during the battle.

== Education ==
=== Preschool education ===
- Chuhuiv preschool educational institution (nursery — kindergarten) No. 1
- Chuhuiv preschool educational institution (nursery — kindergarten) No. 3
- Chuhuiv preschool educational institution (nursery — kindergarten) No. 4
- Chuhuiv preschool educational institution (nursery — kindergarten) No. 8
- Chuhuiv preschool educational institution (nursery — kindergarten) No. 12
- Pre-school unit of Chuguev teaching and educational complex No. 6
- Preschool educational institution VESELOCHKA, VCH А0501

There were six pre-school educational institutions and one pre-school unit as part of the Teaching and Educational Complex No. 6 in the city, in the 2013–2014 academic year; they educated 1 195 preschoolers between the ages of 2 and 6 (7) years old.

=== General secondary education ===
Includes nine schools:

- Ilya Repin Chuguiv comprehensive school of I-III levels No. 1
- Chuguiv comprehensive school of I-III levels No. 2
- Chuguiv comprehensive school of I level No. 3
- Chuguiv comprehensive school of I-II levels No. 4
- Chuguiv gymnasium No. 5
- I. N. Kozhedub, triple Hero of the Soviet Union, Chuguiv teaching and educational complex No. 6
- Chuguiv comprehensive school of I-III levels No. 7
- Chuguiv specialized school of I-III levels No. 8 with advanced study of foreign languages
- Kluhyno-Bashkyrivsʹka comprehensive school of I-III levels

=== Out-of-school education ===
- Chuguiv Centre of Tourism and Local History
- Chuguiv House of Children and Youth Creativity
- Chuguiv Children and Youth Sports School

=== Specialized technical schools ===
- Chuguiv Professional Lyceum
- Chuguiv Professional Agrarian Lyceum

== Demographics ==
As of the 2001 census in Ukraine, Chuhuiv had a population of 37,348. The majority of the city's population are ethnic Ukrainians, yet it has the highest incidence of people with a Russian background in any major settlement in the entire Kharkiv region. The exact distribution of the population by ethnicity according to the 2001 census was:

Ethnic groups in Chuhuiv
	percent
Ukrainians	54.62%
Russians	42.49%
Belarusians	0.67%
Georgians	0.35%
Armenians	0.33%
Azerbaijanis	0.14%
Jews	0.10%
Tatars	0.10%

== Notable people ==
- Semen Altman (born 1946), Ukrainian football coach and former goalkeeper
- Inna Dorofeieva (born 1965), ballerina
- Ilya Repin (1844–1930), sculptor and painter of the Peredvizhniki art school
- Sigrid Schauman (1877–1979), artist and art critic
- Yurii Sodol (born 1970), Ukrainian military officer
- Oleksiy Symonenko (born 1976), Ukrainian lawyer and former Prosecutor General of Ukraine
- Ernest Pogosyants (1935–1990), was a Soviet-Armenian composer of chess problems and endgame studies.
- Mykola Yunakiv (1871-1931), Ukrainian general and civil servant

== Gallery ==
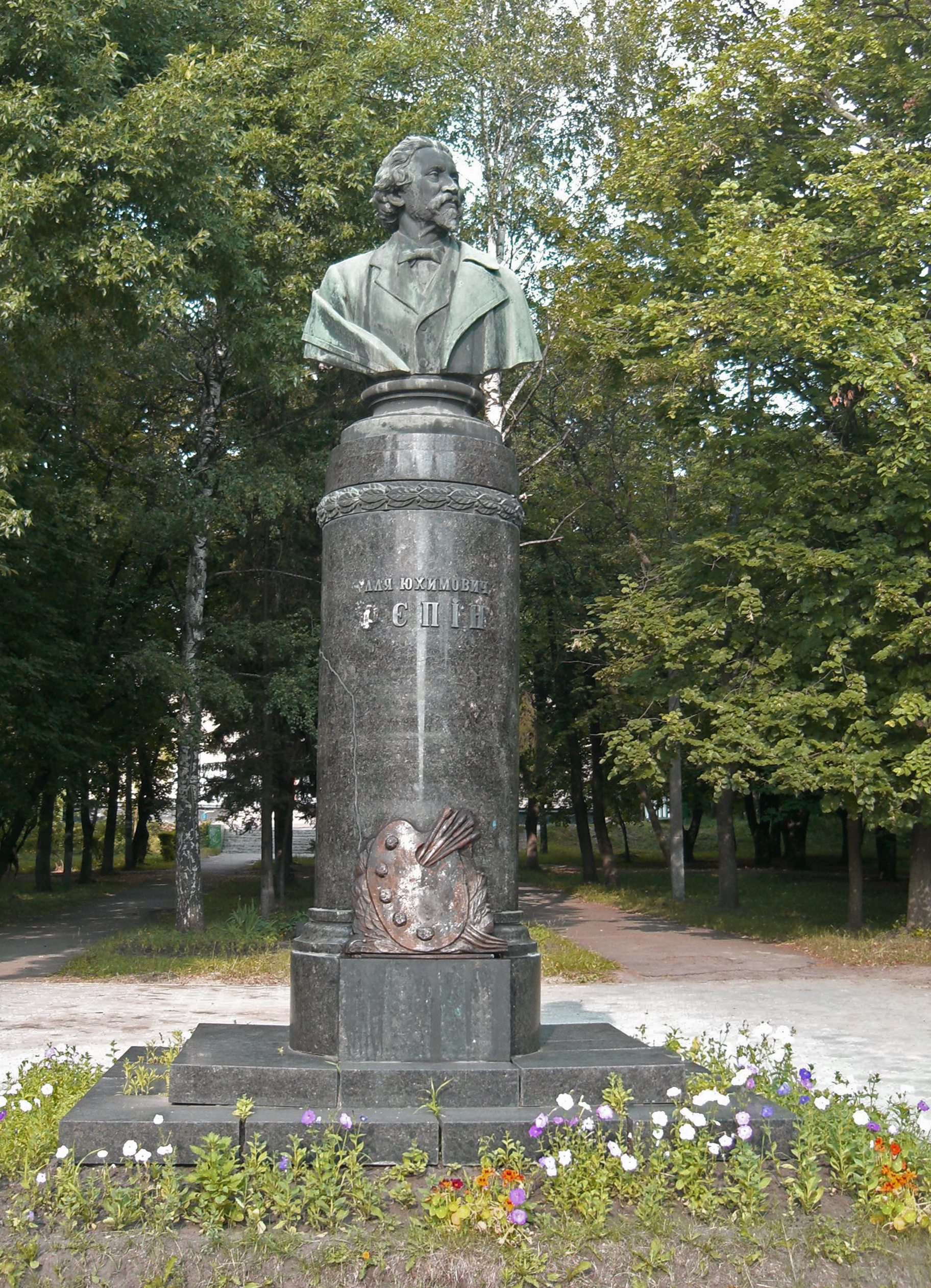
Ilya Repin monument

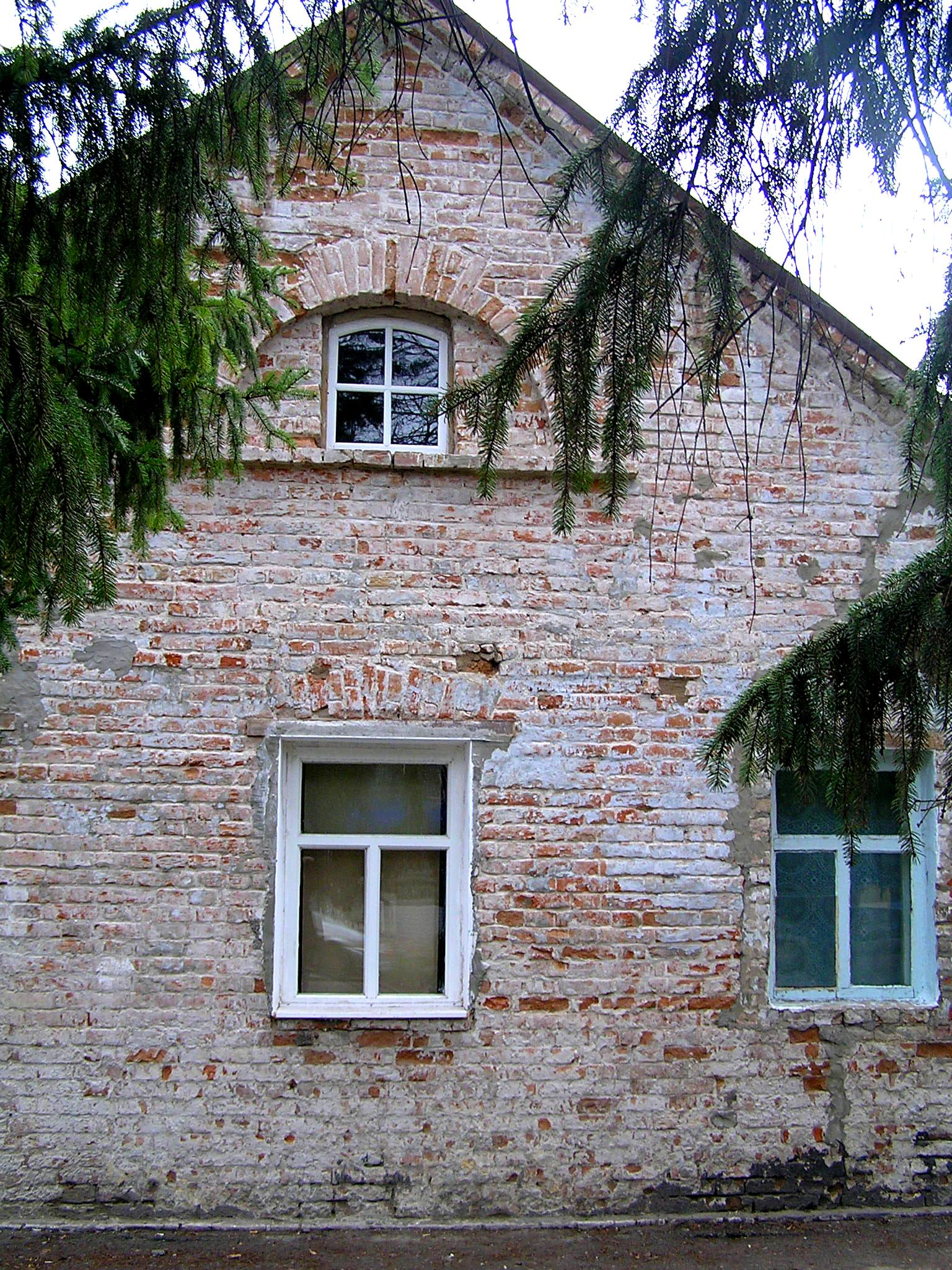
House of a military settler

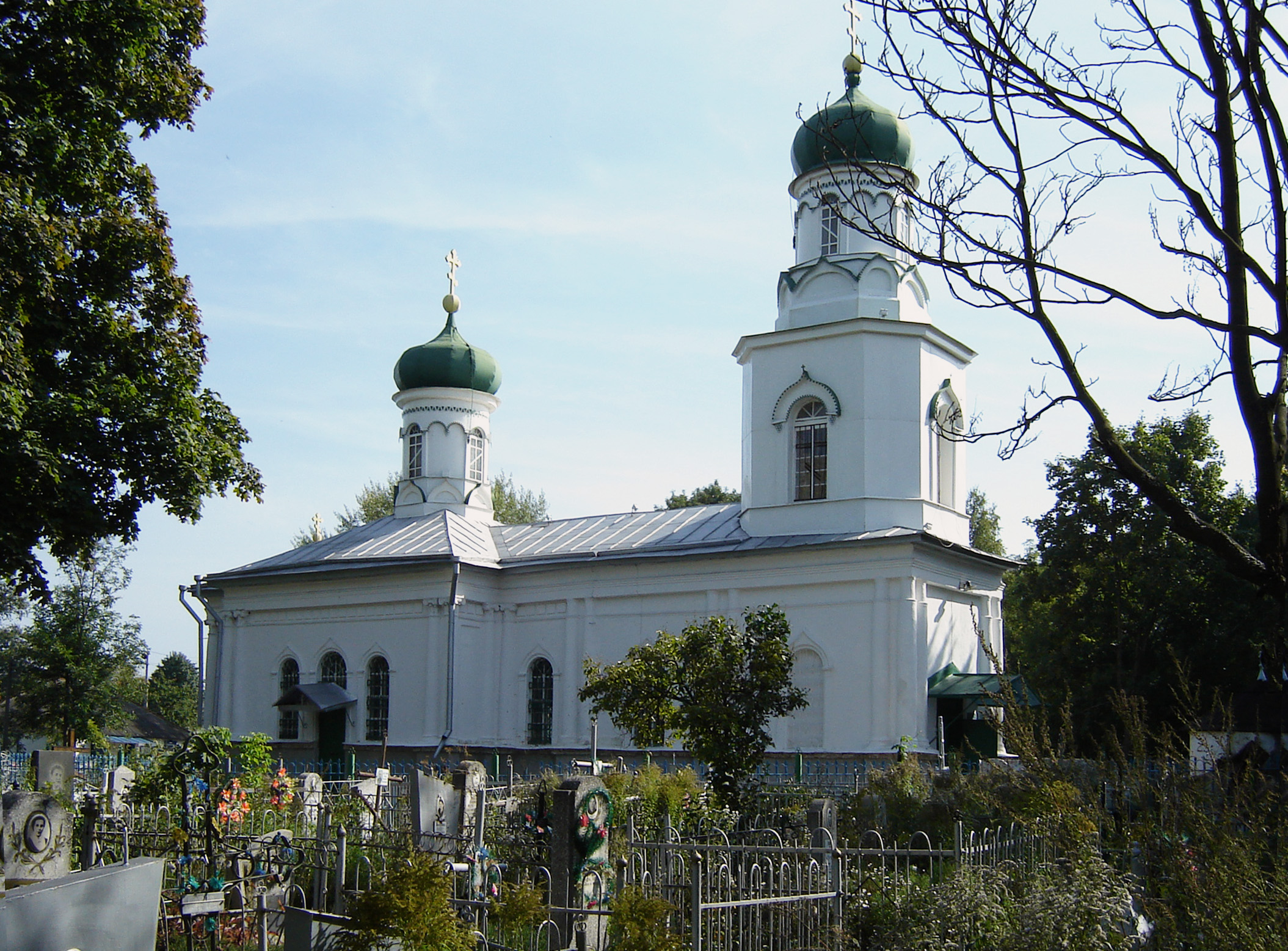
Church of the Icon of Theotokos

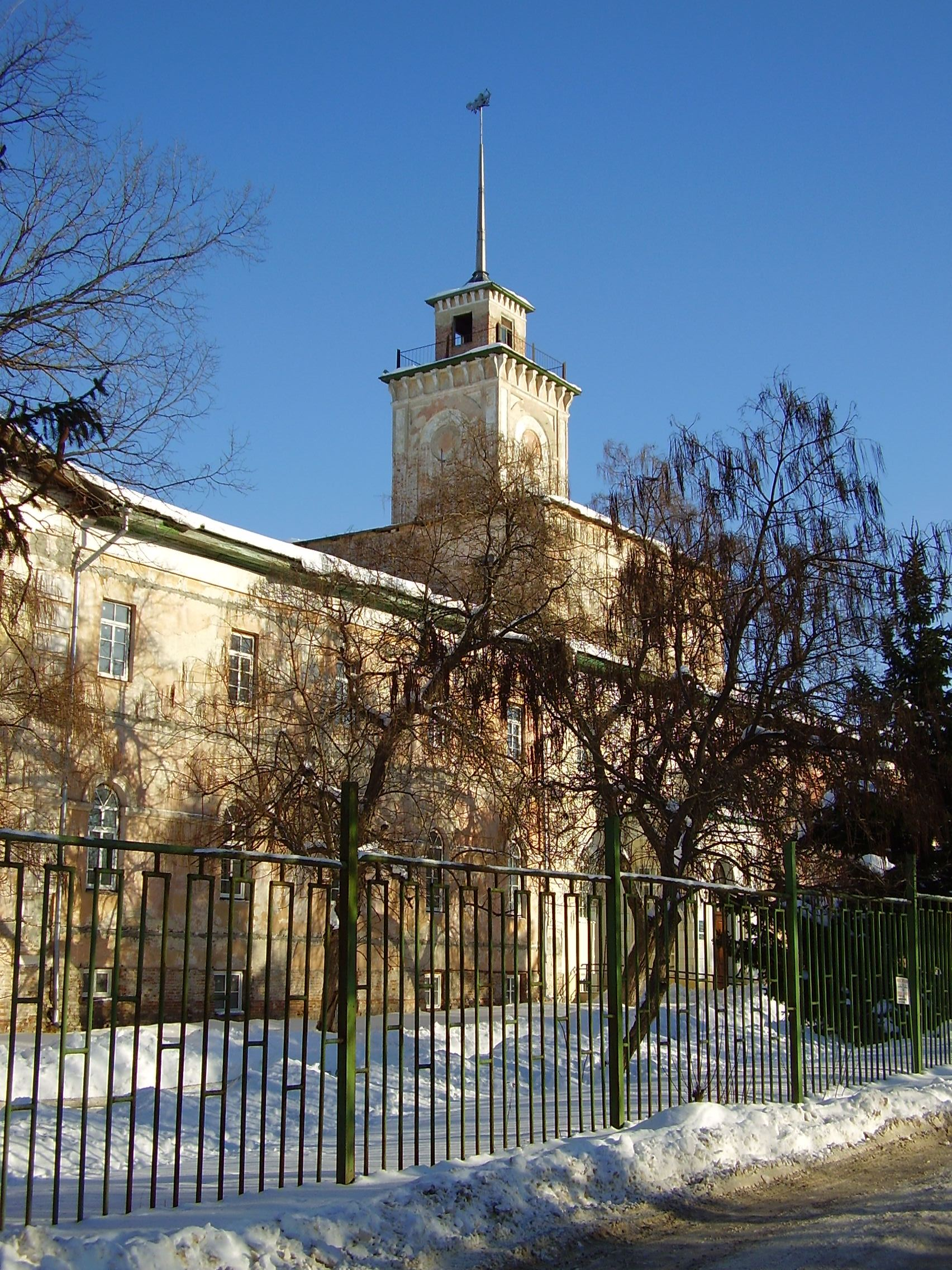
Downtown Chuhuiv

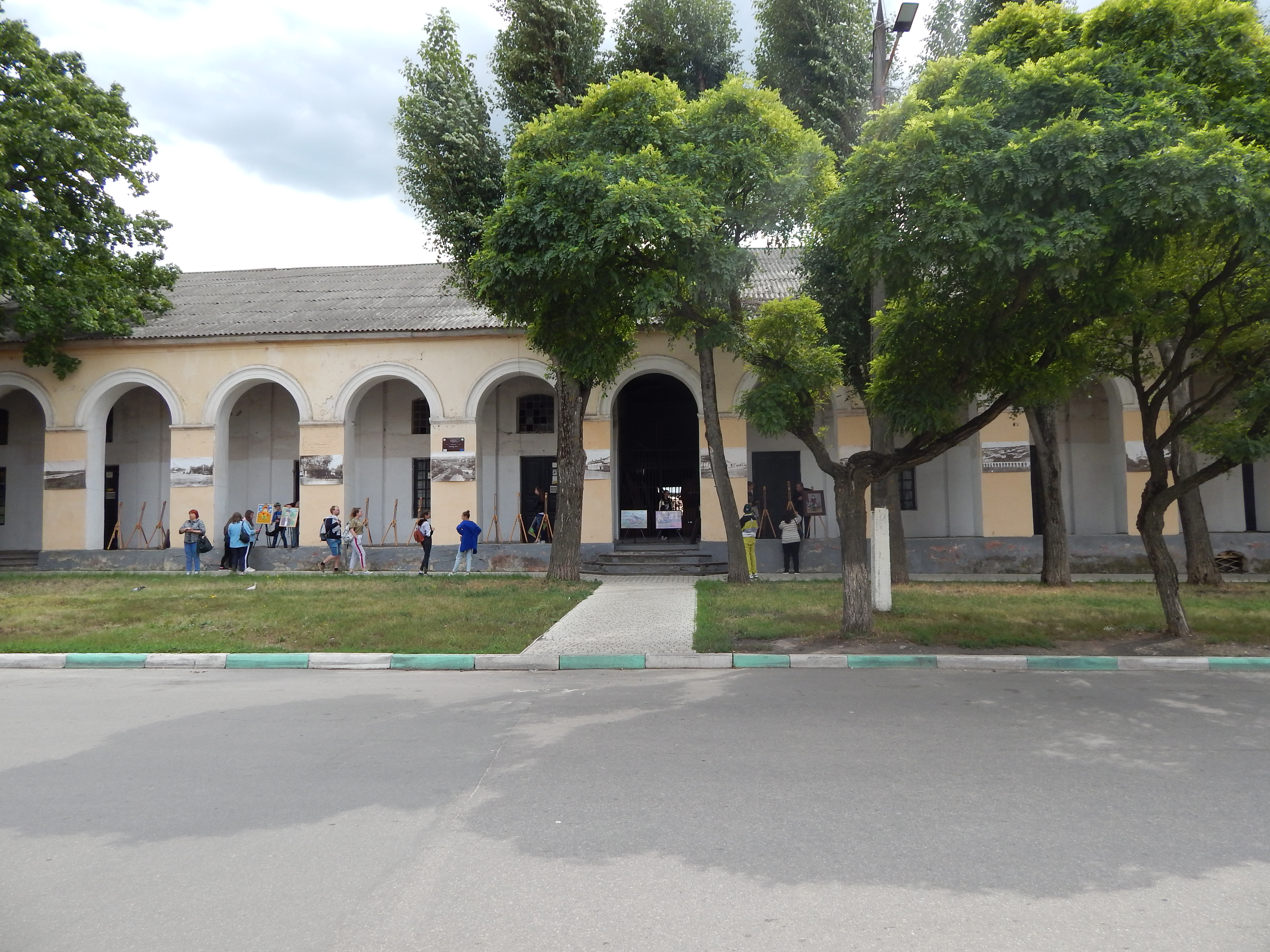
Shopping rows

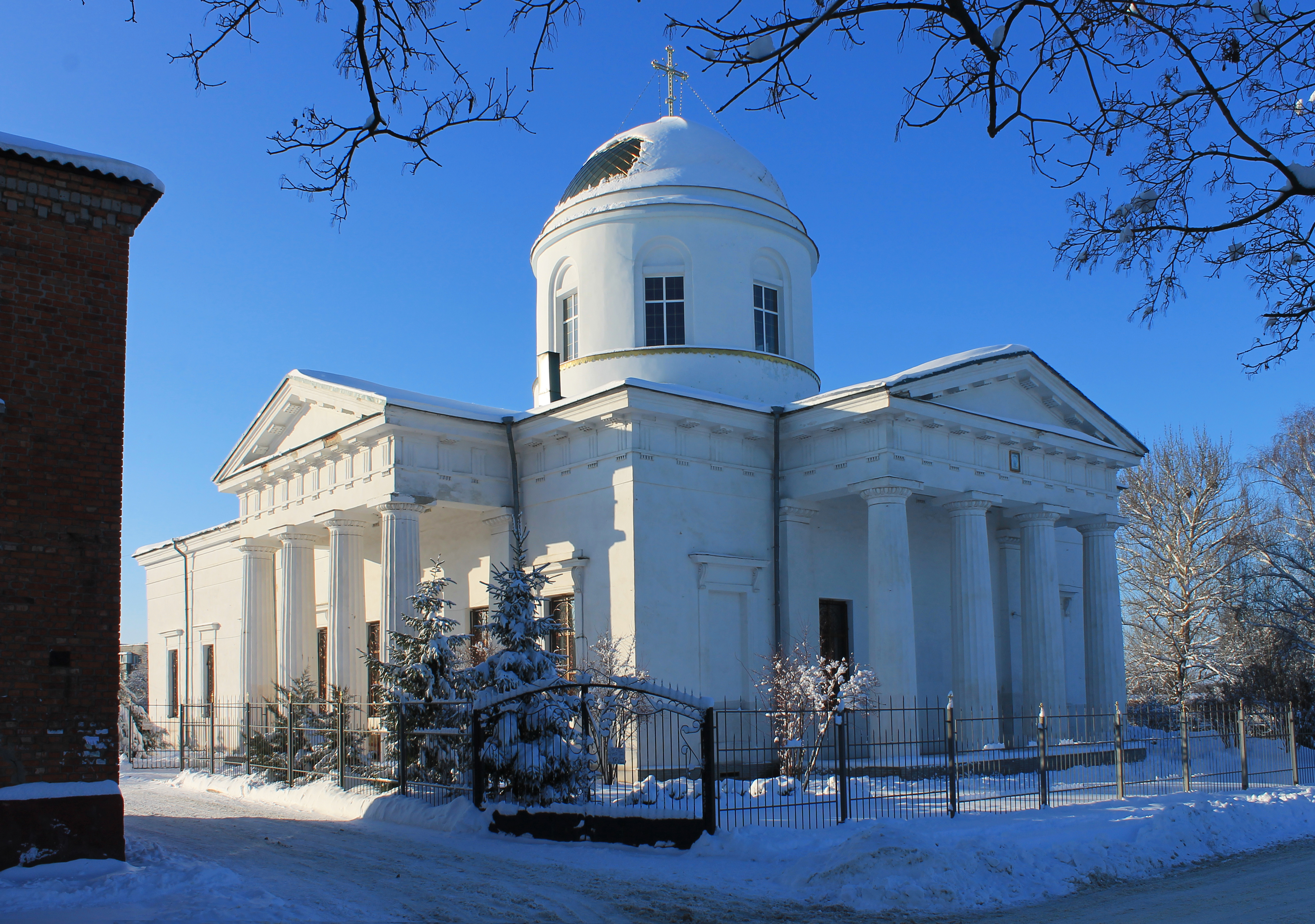
Early 19th century cathedral

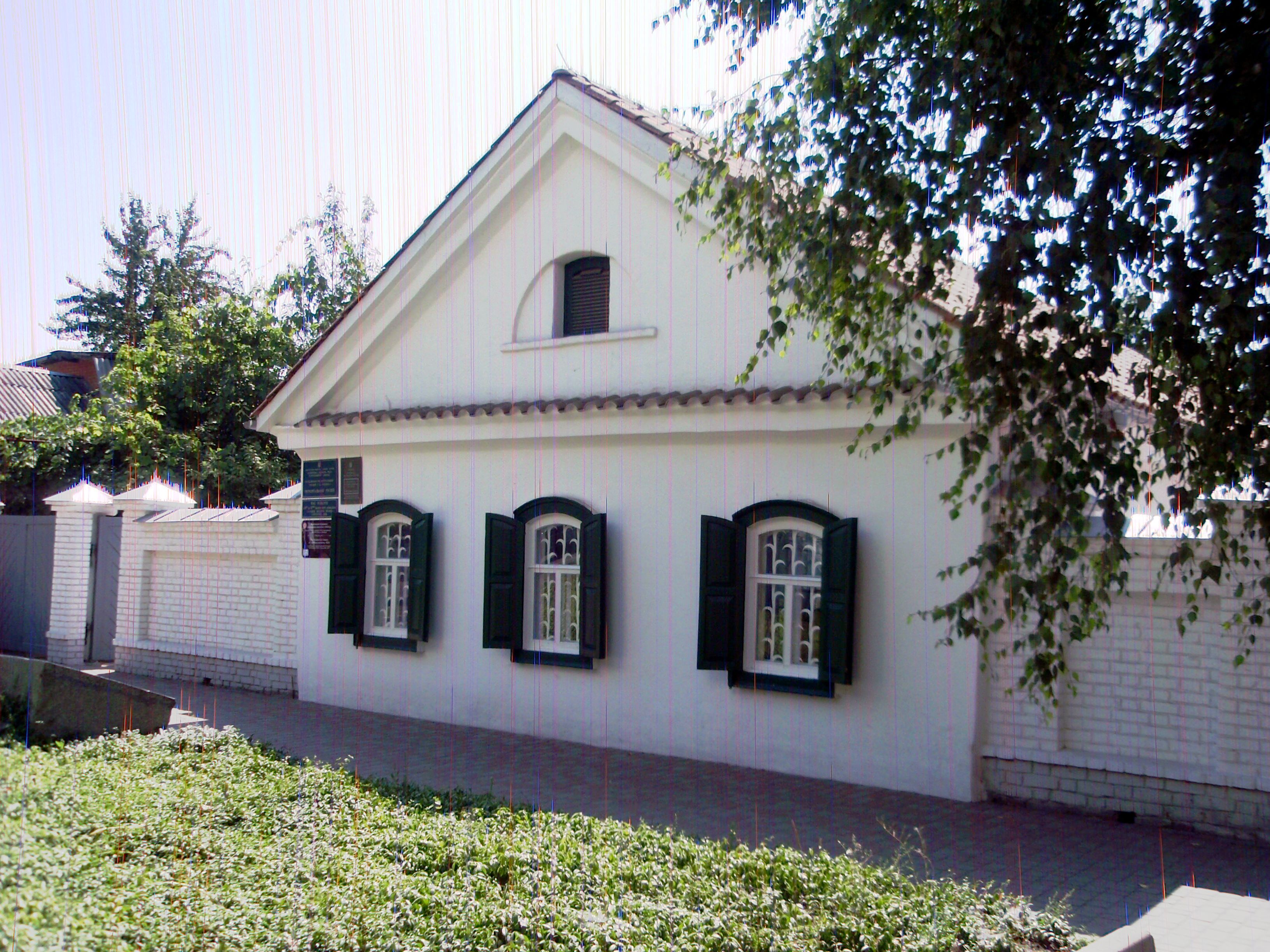
Ilya Repin's house

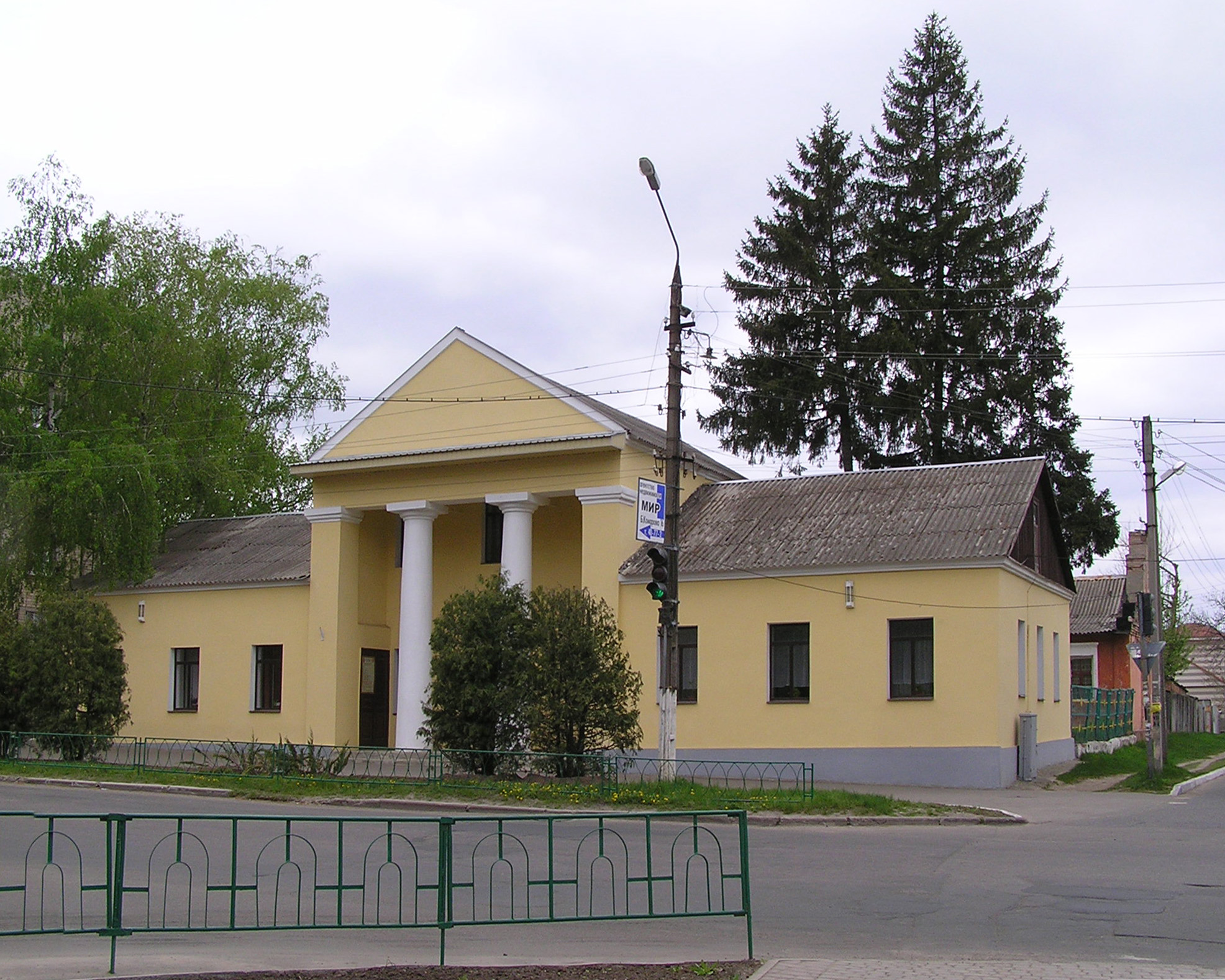
Former City Hall
