= Pavlo Pavliuk =

Pavlo Pavliuk, also known as Pavlo But or Pavlo Mikhnovych (Ukrainian: Павло Павлюк (Бут, Міхнович); Polish: Paweł Michnowicz or Paweł Pawluk; died 1638 in Warsaw) was a Colonel of Registered Cossacks, who was elected as a hetman and led a Cossack-peasant uprising in Left-bank Ukraine and Zaporizhia.

== Career ==
In August 1635, Pavliuk was one of the leaders of a Zaporozhian Cossack outfit, which attacked and destroyed Kodak Fortress while returning from a naval raid. Soon thereafter, the attackers were surrounded and on one of the Dnieper islands and delivered to crown troops by Registered Cossacks who fought in their ranks. Thanks to the intervention of Tomasz Zamoyski, Pavliuk became the only of the outfit's leaders to receive a pardon, while the remaining three commanders, among them Ivan Sulyma, were executed in Warsaw.

The uprising against the abuses of the nobility and magnates of the Polish–Lithuanian Commonwealth was sparked by several Cossacks being expelled from the Cossack Registry. In July 1637 Pavliuk was proclaimed hetman by Cossacks of the Zaporozhian Sich. Soon after his election, Pavliuk issued a universal to Cossacks of Pereyaslav Regiment, declaring their leader Sava Kononovych, who had been recently appointed hetman of Registered Cossacks, a traitor. In late July rebel forces left the Sich and established a camp in Kryliv. Pavliuk ordered Kononovych and other captured commanders of Registered Cossacks to be executed and issued a declaration, in which he proclaimed a fight against the "lords" (pans) in protection of Christian faith and Golden Liberties.

However, a major part of Registered Cossacks refused to support the revolt, and joined government forces sent to suppress it instead. On 16 December 1637 the forces of Polish Crown Hetman Mikołaj Potocki (nicknamed "Bearpaw") defeated the rebels in the Battle of Kumeyki, and Pavliuk surrendered near Borovytsia on December 20. He was succeeded in his command of Registered Cossacks by colonel Ilyash Karaimovich. The General sejm wanted Pavliuk to be executed for rebellion using the usual method of making him look like a jester by putting a heated crown on his head and putting a heated sceptre in his hands. In February 1638, the king's representative Adam Kisiel said that the insurgents had not fought to the death, but had voluntarily surrendered because they had trusted him to be merciful. The King abolished the heated crown and sceptre execution method, and Pavliuk was instead brought to Warsaw, tried and quartered.

== Sources ==
- (in Ukrainian) Новицький Іван. Адам Кисіль, воєвода київський // В. Щербак (упорядник, автор передмови). Коли земля стогнала. — К.: Наукова думка, 1995. — 432 с. — С. 319–382. ISBN 5-319-01072-9
