= Battle of Kumeyki =

Battle at Kumeyki

Battle of Kumeyky
- Part of the Pavlyuk Uprising
Date	December 16, 1637
Location	Kumeiky in modern Cherkasy Oblast, Ukraine
Result	Polish-Lithuanian victory

Belligerents
Polish–Lithuanian Commonwealth	Zaporozhian Cossacks

Commanders and leaders
Mikołaj Potocki	Pavlo Pavliuk

Strength
2,800 cavalry 1,200 dragoons 6 artillery pieces	21,000 men 8 artillery pieces

Casualties and losses
150 killed 350 wounded	6,000 killed

The Battle of Kumeyky (Ukrainian: Битва під Кумейками) was fought during the Pavlyuk Uprising between the Polish crown forces, and Ukrainian peasants and insurgent Cossacks on December 16, 1637. The Polish crown army, under the command of Mikołaj Potocki, surrounded the Cossacks, commanded by Pavlo Pavliuk, in the town of Borovytsia, located in modern-day Cherkasy Oblast in central Ukraine. The Polish forces were unable to capture the town, so Potocki proposed a negotiation, which Pavliuk and the senior starshyna (officers) agreed to. Potocki, ignoring the rules of parley, had Pavliuk and the other leaders of the rebellion taken prisoner during the negotiation talks, sent to Warsaw, and executed.
