= Yakiv Ostryanyn =

Jakiv Ostranin
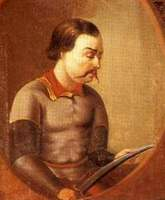
- Died: 1641
- Known for: Ostryanyn uprising
- Partner: Małgorzata from Bnina Łódz coat of arms
- Children: Iskra Ivan Yakovych

Yakov Stepanovich Iskra of the Kopacz coat of arms, also known as Yakiv (Yatsko) Ostrianyn or Ostriantysia (Ukrainian: Яків (Яцько) Острянин (Остряниця), Polish: Jakub Ostrzanin / Ostranica, d. 6 May 1641), was a Cossack hetman and leader of the Ostryanyn uprising. He was descended from the noble family of Iskra of Ostera.

== Biography ==
The first references to him relate to his participation in the Polish-Russian war in 1633, where he served as a colonel of the Registered Cossacks. In 1638 he was elected hetman of the non-registered Cossacks and in the same year initiated an uprising against the Polish–Lithuanian Commonwealth. In March of that year Ostrianyn's troops moved into Left-bank Ukraine and issued an appeal to "all Ruthenian people", including the Orthodox szlachta. In order to suppress the rebellion, troops of Jeremi Wiśniowiecki were sent to the area.

After losing the Battle of Zhovnyn, Ostrianyn fled to the Tsardom of Moscow, where he settled. In Chuguev, the settlers under the command of Ostryanin participated in the fight against the Tatars, who were raiding the southern borders of the state. Yakov died on 6 May 1641, killed by Cossacks during a riot caused by conflicts between privates and Cossacks starshyna.

Kopacz coat of arms
