= Szymon Okolski =

Polish-Lithuanian historian

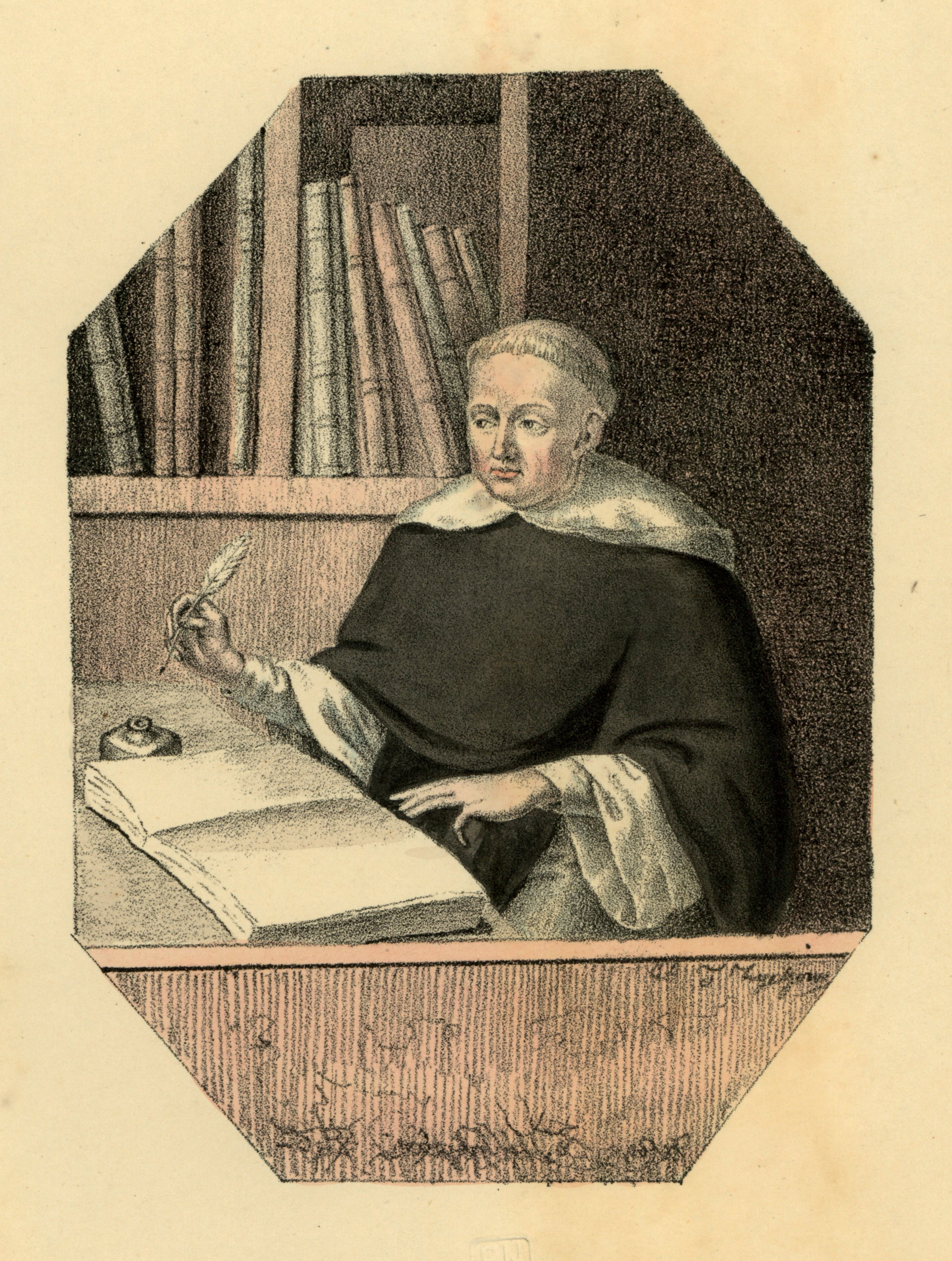
Depiction of Szymon Okolski in Starożytności galicyjskie (Galician Antiquities), published 1840, in Lviv, preceding chapter XVII (pages 36–40).

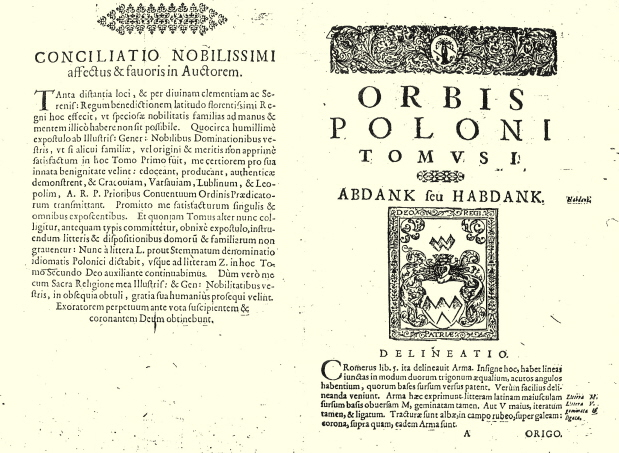
A page from the armorial encyclopedia "Orbis Poloni" written by Simon Okolski (1642)

Szymon Okolski (1580–1653), also known as Simon Okolski, was a well-known Polish–Lithuanian historian, theologian, and specialist in heraldry. His own clan and coat of arms were that of Rawicz. He was born in Kamieniec Podolski, died in Lviv. He headed chairs of theology in Lviv and Bologna. A member of the Dominican Order, in 1641 he became a superior of the Dominican monastery in Kamieniec Podolski. In 1648 Okolski accepted the post of the prowincjał (province leader) of the Dominican Order in the Polish–Lithuanian Commonwealth-controlled Ruś territories. The center of the province was located in Lwow.

In 1637-38 Okolski accompanied Crown hetman Mikołaj Potocki during his neutralization of rebellious Cossacks driven by Jakub Ostrzanin and Dmytro Hunia. Being a witness and a direct participant of those developments, Okolski gave a detailed description of them in his field diaries. The latter were published immediately and became a valuable source of information for historians and writers: for instance, Nikolai Gogol must have used these materials for his "Taras Bulba" - a novel devoted to the Cossack rebellions 1637–38. Okolski was an author of historical and heraldic books among which an armorial encyclopedia of the Polish nobility Orbis Polonus (1641–43) in three volumes is the most famous. Languages of his works are Polish and Latin.

== Published works ==
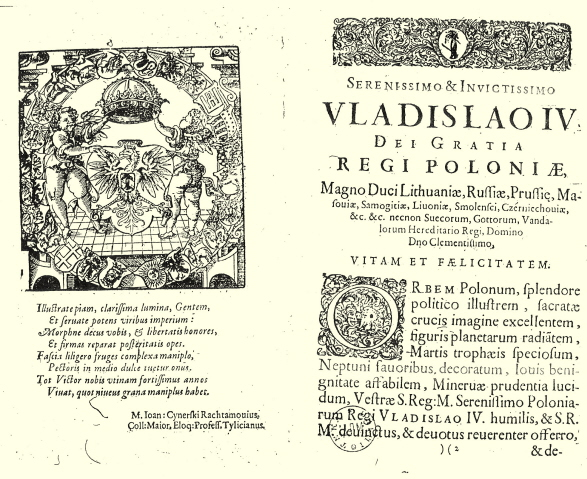
"Orbis Poloni" opens with a thanks and praise of Polish king Władysław IV Vasa

- Orbis Polonus splendoribus coeli, triumphis mundi, pulchritudine animantium condecoratus, in quo antiqua Sarmatorum gentiliata pervetusta nobilitatis insignia etc. specificantur et relucent (in English: Polish Encyclopedia of the ancient Sarmatian families, the history of the coats of arms of the nobles of Poland old and new, their origin as awards for honorable deeds and the arms themselves specifically described and emblazoned) (Vol. 1, 2 and 3, Kraków, 1641–43) - armorial encyclopedia of the Polish nobility;
- "Dyaryusz transactiey wojennej między wojskiem koronnem i zaporoskiem w r. 1637 miesiąca Grudnia przez Mikołaja Potockiego zaczętej i dokończonej», (Zamość, 1638) - field diary concerning the 1637 Cossack rebellion;
- Kontynuacya dyaryusza wojennego etc. (Kraków, 1639) - continuation of Okolski's field notes of the Cossacks neutralization. In 1738 both diaries were translated to Russian by Stephan Lukomski, a historian;
- Russia Florida etc. (Lwów, 1646; 7th edition - Leipzig, 1759) – history of the Dominican Order in Russia, with general data on population, regions, Russian monasteries, etc.;
- Kioviensium et Czernichoviensium episcoporum etc. ordo et numeris descriptus (Lwów, 1646; Polish translation by ks. Serwatowski, Kraków, 1853);
- Żywoty niektórych św. zakonnic dominikanek (cz. I, Kraków 1638; cz. II Niebo ziemskie Anjolów w ciele palma i lilija ozdobione etc. (Lwow 1644).

There are also some Okolski's unpublished manuscripts («Miscellanea») kept in the Dominican monastery in Lviv.

== Literature ==
- Pauli, Ignacy Żegota (1840). "XVII". Starożytności galicyjskie [Galician Antiquities] (in Polish). Lviv: Nakładem Autora. pp. 36–40.
