= Mikołaj Potocki =

Polish nobleman (1595–1651)

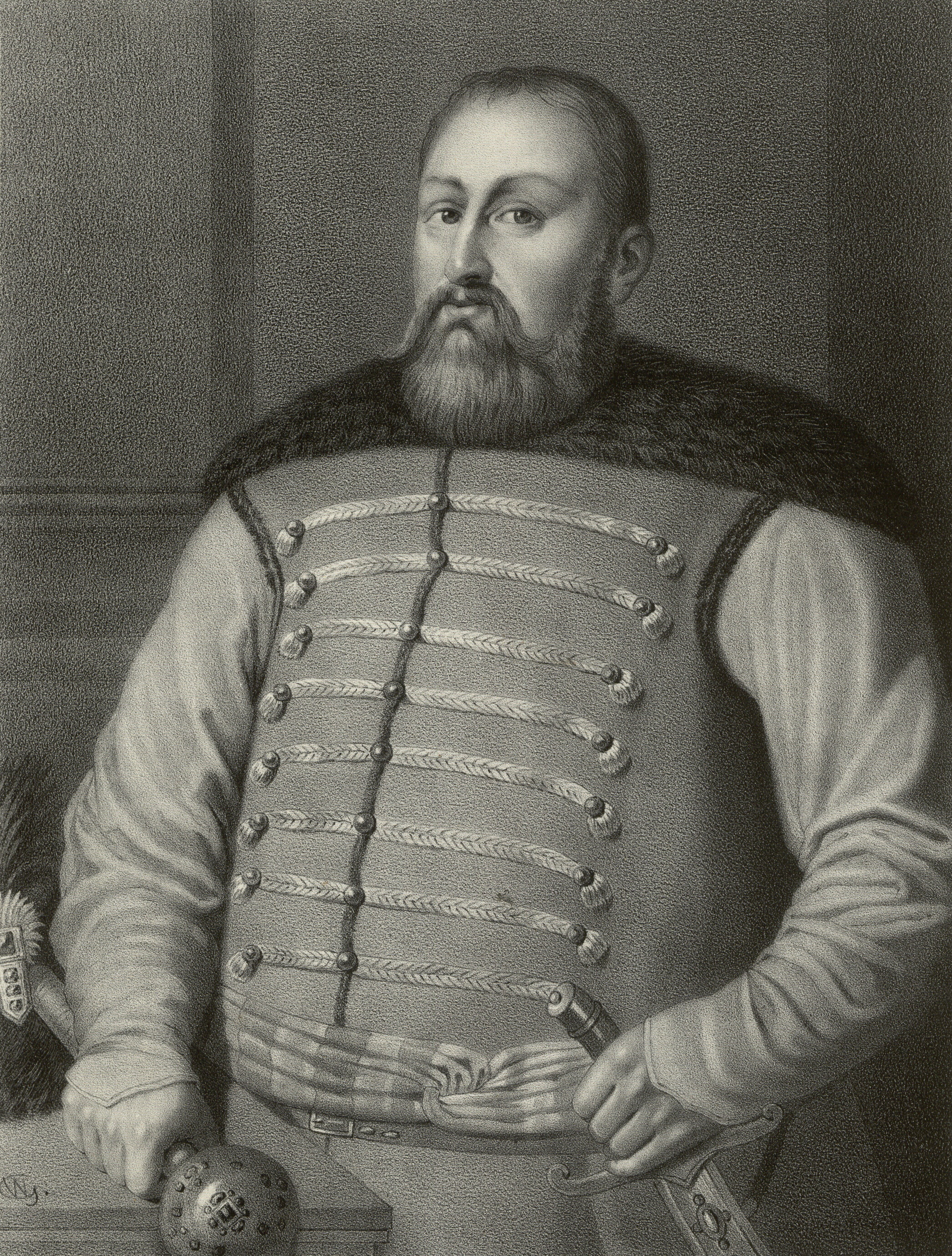
- Coat of arms: Clan Piława
- Born: 1595
- Died: 20 November 1651 (aged 55–56); Chmielnik, Kingdom of Poland, Polish–Lithuanian Commonwealth
- Noble family: Potocki
- Consorts: Zofia Firlej; Elżbieta Kazanowska
- Father: Jakub Potocki
- Mother: Jadwiga Prusinowska

Mikołaj "Bearpaw" Potocki (Polish pronunciation: [miˈkɔwaj pɔˈtɔt͡skʲi]; 1595 – 20 November 1651) was a Polish nobleman (szlachcic) and magnate who served as Field Crown Hetman of the Polish–Lithuanian Commonwealth from 1637 to 1646, Grand Hetman of the Crown from 1646 to 1651, governor of Bracław Voivodeship from 1636, and castellan of Kraków from 1646.

== Career ==
He was captured during the battle of Cecora by the Turks. In 1633, during the Battle of Paniowce, along with Prince Jeremi Wiśniowiecki and Stanisław Koniecpolski, he defeated the Turk forces under Abaza Pasha.

In the 1637 Pavlyuk Uprising, he defeated the Cossacks under Pavlo Pavliuk at the battle of Kumejki. In the 1638 Ostryanyn Uprising, he forced Dmytro Hunia to surrender. After those victories over the Cossacks he received large estates in Ukraine.

The 1637–38 Cossack rebellions suppressed by Potocki were minutely described by historian and bishop Szymon Okolski who witnessed and directly participated in the developments of those days. His field diaries became a valuable information source for historians.

During the Sejm of 1646, Potocki opposed the plan of King Władysław IV Vasa to wage war against the Turks.

He was known to be very oppressive to the peasantry and Cossacks. His behavior was one of the causes of the Khmelnytsky Uprising. In 1648 he disregarded the monarch's orders and attacked rebellious Cossacks in Ukraine. He was defeated at the Battle of Korsuń and captured by Tatars. In April 1650, he was released from jasyr. On 28–30 June 1651, he was victorious over Tatar and Cossack forces at the Battle of Berestechko.

On 18 September 1651, after the indecisive Battle of Bila Tserkva, he negotiated a treaty with the Cossacks.

== Personal life ==
Potocki had two wives, Zofia Firlej and Elżbieta Kazanowska. He had six children with Firlej: Piotr Potocki, Stefan Potocki, Mikołaj Potocki, Marianna Potocka, Wiktoria Potocka and Henryk Potocki. With Kazanowska he had three children: Jakub Potocki, Joanna Potocka and Dominik Potocki.

Preceded by Stanisław Koniecpolski	Great Hetman of the Crown; 1646-1651	Succeeded by Stanisław "Rewera" Potocki
Preceded by Marcin Kazanowski	Field Hetman of the Crown; 1637-1646	Succeeded by Marcin Kalinowski
Preceded by Łukasz Żółkiewski	Voivode of Bracław; 1636-1646	Succeeded by Dominik Aleksander Kazanowski
Preceded by Jakub Sobieski	Castellan of Kraków; 1646–1651	Succeeded by Stanisław Warszycki
