= Dmytro Hunia =

Dmytro Hunia (Ukrainian: Дмитро Гуня; Polish: Dymitr Hunia) was elected hetman of the Zaporozhian Host in 1638. He was one of the leaders of the Ostryanyn Uprising, a 1638 Cossack uprising against the Polish–Lithuanian Commonwealth. The rebellion was sparked by the Sejm act of the same year that declared that non-Registered Cossacks are equal to ordinary peasants in their rights (and should be subjected to serfdom). The uprising was quelled by the forces of Jeremi Wiśniowiecki and Mikołaj Potocki. After a series of skirmishes the Cossacks capitulated at the Starzec river. Hunia and some other cossacks managed to flee to Russia.

== See also ==
- Yakiv Ostryanyn
