= Surface (topology) =

Two-dimensional manifold

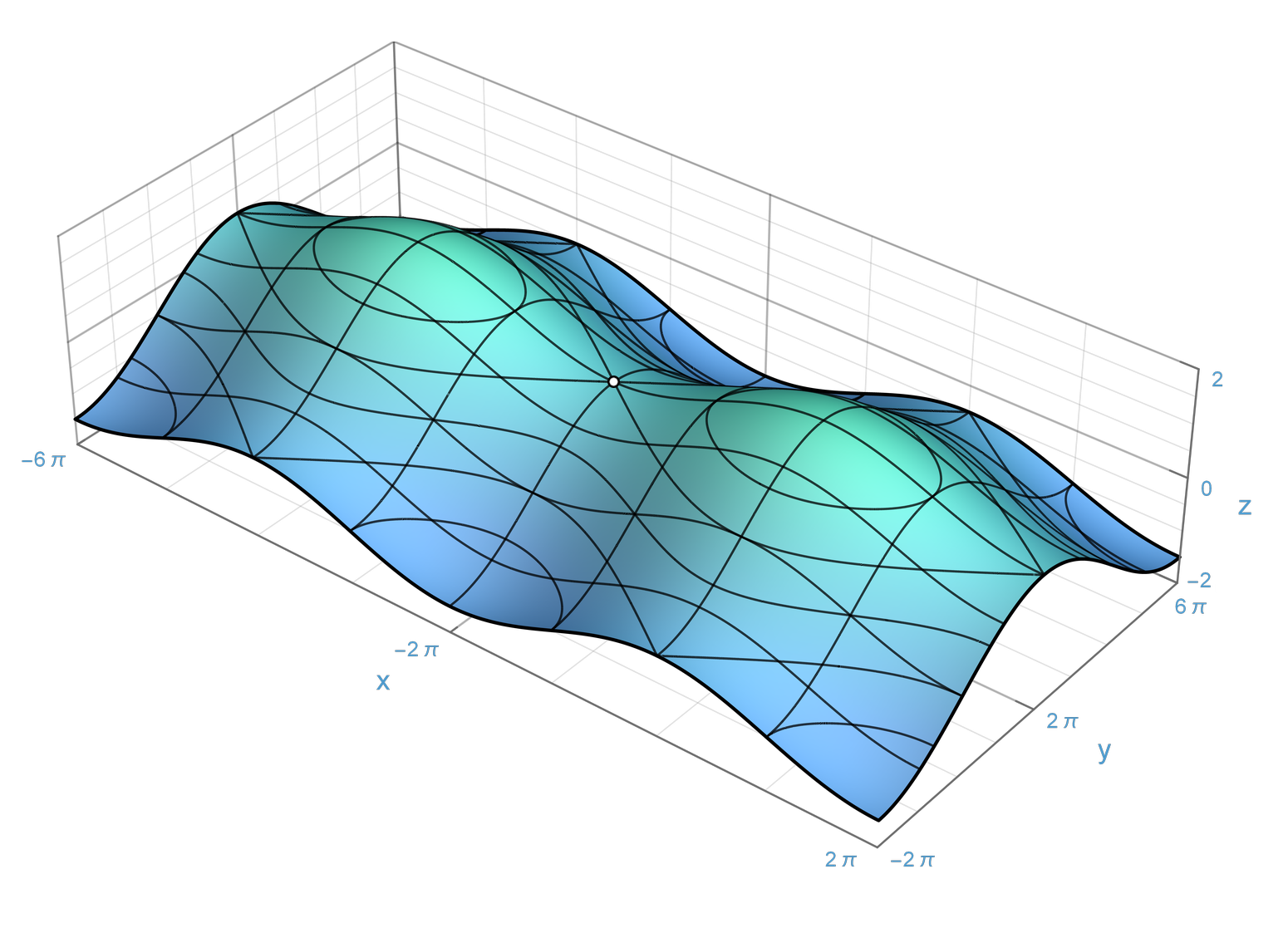
An open surface with x-, y-, and z-contours shown.

In topology, a surface is a two-dimensional manifold. Some surfaces arise as the boundaries of three-dimensional solid figures; for example, the sphere is the boundary of the solid ball. Other surfaces arise as graphs of functions of two variables; see the figure at right. However, surfaces can also be defined abstractly, without reference to any ambient space. For example, the Klein bottle is a surface that cannot be embedded in three-dimensional Euclidean space.

Topological surfaces are sometimes equipped with additional information, such as a Riemannian metric or a complex structure, that connects them to other disciplines within mathematics, such as differential geometry and complex analysis. The various mathematical notions of surface can be used to model surfaces in the physical world.

== In general ==
In mathematics, a surface is a geometrical shape that resembles a deformed plane. The most familiar examples arise as boundaries of solid objects in ordinary three-dimensional Euclidean space R^{3}, such as spheres. The exact definition of a surface may depend on the context. Typically, in algebraic geometry, a surface may cross itself (and may have other singularities), while, in topology and differential geometry, it may not.

A surface is a two-dimensional space; this means that a moving point on a surface may move in two directions (it has two degrees of freedom). In other words, around almost every point, there is a coordinate patch on which a two-dimensional coordinate system is defined. For example, the surface of the Earth resembles (ideally) a two-dimensional sphere, and latitude and longitude provide two-dimensional coordinates on it (except at the poles and along the 180th meridian).

The concept of surface is widely used in physics, engineering, computer graphics, and many other disciplines, primarily in representing the surfaces of physical objects. For example, in analyzing the aerodynamic properties of an airplane, the central consideration is the flow of air along its surface.

== Definitions and first examples ==
A (topological) surface is a topological space in which every point has an open neighbourhood homeomorphic to some open subset of the Euclidean plane E^{2}. Such a neighborhood, together with the corresponding homeomorphism, is known as a (coordinate) chart. It is through this chart that the neighborhood inherits the standard coordinates on the Euclidean plane. These coordinates are known as local coordinates and these homeomorphisms lead us to describe surfaces as being locally Euclidean.

In most writings on the subject, it is often assumed, explicitly or implicitly, that as a topological space a surface is also nonempty, second-countable, and Hausdorff. It is also often assumed that the surfaces under consideration are connected.

The rest of this article will assume, unless specified otherwise, that a surface is nonempty, Hausdorff, second-countable, and connected.

More generally, a (topological) surface with boundary is a Hausdorff topological space in which every point has an open neighbourhood homeomorphic to some open subset of the closure of the upper half-plane H^{2} in C. These homeomorphisms are also known as (coordinate) charts. The boundary of the upper half-plane is the x-axis. A point on the surface mapped via a chart to the x-axis is termed a boundary point. The collection of such points is known as the boundary of the surface which is necessarily a one-manifold, that is, the union of closed curves. On the other hand, a point mapped to above the x-axis is an interior point. The collection of interior points is the interior of the surface which is always non-empty. The closed disk is a simple example of a surface with boundary. The boundary of the disc is a circle.

The term surface used without qualification refers to surfaces without boundary. In particular, a surface with empty boundary is a surface in the usual sense. A surface with empty boundary which is compact is known as a 'closed' surface. The two-dimensional sphere, the two-dimensional torus, and the real projective plane are examples of closed surfaces.

The Möbius strip is a surface on which the distinction between clockwise and counterclockwise can be defined locally, but not globally. In general, a surface is said to be orientable if it does not contain a homeomorphic copy of the Möbius strip; intuitively, it has two distinct "sides". For example, the sphere and torus are orientable, while the real projective plane is not (because the real projective plane with one point removed is homeomorphic to the open Möbius strip).

In differential and algebraic geometry, extra structure is added upon the topology of the surface. This added structure can be a smoothness structure (making it possible to define differentiable maps to and from the surface), a Riemannian metric (making it possible to define length and angles on the surface), a complex structure (making it possible to define holomorphic maps to and from the surface—in which case the surface is called a Riemann surface), or an algebraic structure (making it possible to detect singularities, such as self-intersections and cusps, that cannot be described solely in terms of the underlying topology).

== Extrinsically defined surfaces and embeddings ==
A sphere can be defined parametrically (by x = r sin θ cos φ, y = r sin θ sin φ, z = r cos θ) or implicitly (by x^{2} + y^{2} + z^{2} − r^{2} = 0.)

Historically, surfaces were initially defined as subspaces of Euclidean spaces. Often, these surfaces were the locus of zeros of certain functions, usually polynomial functions. Such a definition considered the surface as part of a larger (Euclidean) space, and as such was termed extrinsic.

In the previous section, a surface is defined as a topological space with certain properties, namely Hausdorff and locally Euclidean. This topological space is not considered a subspace of another space. In this sense, the definition given above, which is the definition that mathematicians use at present, is intrinsic.

A surface defined as intrinsic is not required to satisfy the added constraint of being a subspace of Euclidean space. It may seem possible for some surfaces defined intrinsically to not be surfaces in the extrinsic sense. However, the Whitney embedding theorem asserts every surface can in fact be embedded homeomorphically into Euclidean space, in fact into E^{4}: The extrinsic and intrinsic approaches turn out to be equivalent.

In fact, any compact surface that is either orientable or has a boundary can be embedded in E^{3}; on the other hand, the real projective plane, which is compact, non-orientable and without boundary, cannot be embedded into E^{3} (see Gramain). Steiner surfaces, including Boy's surface, the Roman surface and the cross-cap, are models of the real projective plane in E^{3}, but only the Boy surface is an immersed surface. All these models are singular at points where they intersect themselves.

The Alexander horned sphere is a well-known pathological embedding of the two-sphere into the three-sphere.

A knotted torus.

The chosen embedding (if any) of a surface into another space is regarded as extrinsic information; it is not essential to the surface itself. For example, a torus can be embedded into E^{3} in the "standard" manner (which looks like a bagel) or in a knotted manner (see figure). The two embedded tori are homeomorphic, but not isotopic: They are topologically equivalent, but their embeddings are not.

The image of a continuous, injective function from R^{2} to higher-dimensional R^{n} is said to be a parametric surface. Such an image is so-called because the x- and y- directions of the domain R^{2} are 2 variables that parametrize the image. A parametric surface need not be a topological surface. A surface of revolution can be viewed as a special kind of parametric surface.

If f is a smooth function from R^{3} to R whose gradient is nowhere zero, then the locus of zeros of f does define a surface, known as an implicit surface. If the condition of non-vanishing gradient is dropped, then the zero locus may develop singularities.

== Construction from polygons ==
Each closed surface can be constructed from an oriented polygon with an even number of sides, called a fundamental polygon of the surface, by pairwise identification of its edges. For example, in each polygon below, attaching the sides with matching labels (A with A, B with B), so that the arrows point in the same direction, yields the indicated surface.

sphere

real projective plane

torus

Klein bottle

Any fundamental polygon can be written symbolically as follows. Begin at any vertex, and proceed around the perimeter of the polygon in either direction until returning to the starting vertex. During this traversal, record the label on each edge in order, with an exponent of -1 if the edge points opposite to the direction of traversal. The four models above, when traversed clockwise starting at the upper left, yield

- sphere: $A B B^{-1} A^{-1}$
- real projective plane: $A B A B$
- torus: $A B A^{-1} B^{-1}$
- Klein bottle: $A B A B^{-1}$.

Note that the sphere and the projective plane can both be realized as quotients of the 2-gon, while the torus and Klein bottle require a 4-gon (square).

The expression thus derived from a fundamental polygon of a surface turns out to be the sole relation in a presentation of the fundamental group of the surface with the polygon edge labels as generators. This is a consequence of the Seifert–van Kampen theorem.

Gluing edges of polygons is a special kind of quotient space process. The quotient concept can be applied in greater generality to produce new or alternative constructions of surfaces. For example, the real projective plane can be obtained as the quotient of the sphere by identifying all pairs of opposite points on the sphere. Another example of a quotient is the connected sum.

== Connected sums ==
The connected sum of two surfaces M and N, denoted M # N, is obtained by removing a disk from each of them and gluing them along the boundary components that result. The boundary of a disk is a circle, so these boundary components are circles. The Euler characteristic $\chi$ of M # N is the sum of the Euler characteristics of the summands, minus two:

$$\chi(M \mathbin{\#} N) = \chi(M) + \chi(N) - 2.\,$$

The sphere S is an identity element for the connected sum, meaning that S # M = M. This is because deleting a disk from the sphere leaves a disk, which simply replaces the disk deleted from M upon gluing.

Connected summation with the torus T is also described as attaching a "handle" to the other summand M. If M is orientable, then so is T # M. The connected sum is associative, so the connected sum of a finite collection of surfaces is well-defined.

The connected sum of two real projective planes, P # P, is the Klein bottle K. The connected sum of the real projective plane and the Klein bottle is homeomorphic to the connected sum of the real projective plane with the torus; in a formula, P # K = P # T. Thus, the connected sum of three real projective planes is homeomorphic to the connected sum of the real projective plane with the torus. Any connected sum involving a real projective plane is nonorientable.

== Closed surfaces ==
A closed surface is a surface that is compact and without boundary. Examples of closed surfaces include the sphere, the torus and the Klein bottle. Examples of non-closed surfaces include an open disk (which is a sphere with a puncture), an open cylinder (which is a sphere with two punctures), and the Möbius strip.

A surface embedded in three-dimensional space is closed if and only if it is the boundary of a solid. As with any closed manifold, a surface embedded in Euclidean space that is closed with respect to the inherited Euclidean topology is not necessarily a closed surface; for example, a disk embedded in $\mathbb{R}^3$ that contains its boundary is a surface that is topologically closed but not a closed surface.

=== Classification of closed surfaces ===
Some examples of orientable closed surfaces (left) and surfaces with boundary (right). Left: Some orientable closed surfaces are the surface of a sphere, the surface of a torus, and the surface of a cube. (The cube and the sphere are topologically equivalent to each other.) Right: Some surfaces with boundary are the disk surface, square surface, and hemisphere surface. The boundaries are shown in red. All three of these are topologically equivalent to each other.

The classification theorem of closed surfaces states that any connected closed surface is homeomorphic to some member of one of these three families:

1. the sphere,
2. the connected sum of g tori for g ≥ 1,
3. the connected sum of k real projective planes for k ≥ 1.

The surfaces in the first two families are orientable. It is convenient to combine the two families by regarding the sphere as the connected sum of 0 tori. The number g of tori involved is called the genus of the surface. The sphere and the torus have Euler characteristics 2 and 0, respectively, and in general the Euler characteristic of the connected sum of g tori is 2 − 2g.

The surfaces in the third family are nonorientable. The Euler characteristic of the real projective plane is 1, and in general the Euler characteristic of the connected sum of k of them is 2 − k.

It follows that a closed surface is determined, up to homeomorphism, by two pieces of information: its Euler characteristic, and whether it is orientable or not. In other words, Euler characteristic and orientability completely classify closed surfaces up to homeomorphism.

Closed surfaces with multiple connected components are classified by the class of each of their connected components, and thus one generally assumes that the surface is connected.

=== Monoid structure ===
Relating this classification to connected sums, the closed surfaces up to homeomorphism form a commutative monoid under the operation of connected sum, as indeed do manifolds of any fixed dimension. The identity is the sphere, while the real projective plane and the torus generate this monoid, with a single relation P # P # P = P # T, which may also be written P # K = P # T, since K = P # P. This relation is sometimes known as Dyck's theorem after Walther von Dyck, who proved it in (Dyck 1888), and the triple cross surface P # P # P is accordingly called Dyck's surface.

Geometrically, connect-sum with a torus (# T) adds a handle with both ends attached to the same side of the surface, while connect-sum with a Klein bottle (# K) adds a handle with the two ends attached to opposite sides of an orientable surface; in the presence of a projective plane (# P), the surface is not orientable (there is no notion of side), so there is no difference between attaching a torus and attaching a Klein bottle, which explains the relation.

=== Proof ===
The classification of closed surfaces has been known since the 1860s, and today a number of proofs exist.

Topological and combinatorial proofs in general rely on the difficult result that every compact 2-manifold is homeomorphic to a simplicial complex, which is of interest in its own right. The most common proof of the classification is (Seifert & Threlfall 1980), which brings every triangulated surface to a standard form. A simplified proof, which avoids a standard form, was discovered by John H. Conway circa 1992, which he called the "Zero Irrelevancy Proof" or "ZIP proof" and is presented in (Francis & Weeks 1999).

A geometric proof, which yields a stronger geometric result, is the uniformization theorem. This was originally proven only for Riemann surfaces in the 1880s and 1900s by Felix Klein, Paul Koebe, and Henri Poincaré.

== Surfaces with boundary ==
Compact surfaces with boundary are closed surfaces with a finite number of holes (open discs that have been removed). A compact connected surface with boundary is classified by the orientability and Euler characteristic of the corresponding closed surface and the number of boundary components. The genus of a compact surface is defined as the genus of the corresponding closed surface. An alternative classification of compact connected surfaces with boundary is by orientability, genus, and the number of boundary components.

This classification follows almost immediately from the classification of closed surfaces: removing an open disc from a closed surface yields a compact surface with a circle for boundary component, and removing k open discs yields a compact surface with k disjoint circles for boundary components. The precise locations of the holes are irrelevant, because the homeomorphism group acts k-transitively on any connected manifold of dimension at least 2.

Conversely, the boundary of a compact surface is a closed 1-manifold, and is therefore the disjoint union of a finite number of circles; filling these circles with disks (formally, taking the cone) yields a closed surface.

The unique compact orientable surface of genus g and with k boundary components is often denoted $\Sigma_{g,k},$ for example in the study of the mapping class group.

== Non-compact surfaces ==
Non-compact surfaces are more difficult to classify. As a simple example, a non-compact surface can be obtained by puncturing (removing a finite set of points from) a closed manifold. On the other hand, any open subset of a compact surface is itself a non-compact surface; consider, for example, the complement of a Cantor set in the sphere, otherwise known as the Cantor tree surface. However, not every non-compact surface is a subset of a compact surface; two canonical counterexamples are the Jacob's ladder and the Loch Ness monster, which are non-compact surfaces with infinite genus.

A non-compact surface M has a non-empty space of ends E(M), which informally speaking describes the ways that the surface "goes off to infinity". The space E(M) is always topologically equivalent to a closed subspace of the Cantor set. M may have a finite or countably infinite number N_{h} of handles, as well as a finite or countably infinite number N_{p} of projective planes. If both N_{h} and N_{p} are finite, then these two numbers, and the topological type of space of ends, classify the surface M up to topological equivalence. If either or both of N_{h} and N_{p} is infinite, then the topological type of M depends not only on these two numbers but also on how the infinite one(s) approach the space of ends. In general the topological type of M is determined by the four subspaces of E(M) that are limit points of infinitely many handles and infinitely many projective planes, limit points of only handles, limit points of only projective planes, and limit points of neither.

== Assumption of second-countability ==
If one removes the assumption of second-countability from the definition of a surface, there exist (necessarily non-compact) topological surfaces having no countable base for their topology. Perhaps the simplest example is the Cartesian product of the long line with the space of real numbers.

Another surface having no countable base for its topology, but not requiring the Axiom of Choice to prove its existence, is the Prüfer manifold, which can be described by simple equations that show it to be a real-analytic surface. The Prüfer manifold may be thought of as the upper half plane together with one additional "tongue" T_{x} hanging down from it directly below the point (x,0), for each real x.

In 1925, Tibor Radó proved that all Riemann surfaces (i.e., one-dimensional complex manifolds) are necessarily second-countable (Radó's theorem). By contrast, if one replaces the real numbers in the construction of the Prüfer surface by the complex numbers, one obtains a two-dimensional complex manifold (which is necessarily a 4-dimensional real manifold) with no countable base.

== Surfaces in geometry ==
Polyhedra, such as the boundary of a cube, are among the first surfaces encountered in geometry. It is also possible to define smooth surfaces, in which each point has a neighborhood diffeomorphic to some open set in E^{2}. This elaboration allows calculus to be applied to surfaces to prove many results.

Two smooth surfaces are diffeomorphic if and only if they are homeomorphic. (The analogous result does not hold for higher-dimensional manifolds.) Thus closed surfaces are classified up to diffeomorphism by their Euler characteristic and orientability.

Smooth surfaces equipped with Riemannian metrics are of foundational importance in differential geometry. A Riemannian metric endows a surface with notions of geodesic, distance, angle, and area. It also gives rise to Gaussian curvature, which describes how curved or bent the surface is at each point. Curvature is a rigid, geometric property, in that it is not preserved by general diffeomorphisms of the surface. However, the famous Gauss–Bonnet theorem for closed surfaces states that the integral of the Gaussian curvature K over the entire surface S is determined by the Euler characteristic:

$$\int_S K \; dA = 2 \pi \chi(S).$$

This result exemplifies the deep relationship between the geometry and topology of surfaces (and, to a lesser extent, higher-dimensional manifolds).

Another way in which surfaces arise in geometry is by passing into the complex domain. A complex one-manifold is a smooth oriented surface, also called a Riemann surface. Any complex nonsingular algebraic curve viewed as a complex manifold is a Riemann surface. In fact, every compact orientable surface is realizable as a Riemann surface. Thus compact Riemann surfaces are characterized topologically by their genus: 0, 1, 2, .... On the other hand, the genus does not characterize the complex structure. For example, there are uncountably many non-isomorphic compact Riemann surfaces of genus 1 (the elliptic curves).

Complex structures on a closed oriented surface correspond to conformal equivalence classes of Riemannian metrics on the surface. One version of the uniformization theorem (due to Poincaré) states that any Riemannian metric on an oriented, closed surface is conformally equivalent to an essentially unique metric of constant curvature. This provides a starting point for one of the approaches to Teichmüller theory, which provides a finer classification of Riemann surfaces than the topological one by Euler characteristic alone.

A complex surface is a complex two-manifold and thus a real four-manifold; it is not a surface in the sense of this article. Neither are algebraic curves defined over fields other than the complex numbers, nor are algebraic surfaces defined over fields other than the real numbers.

== See also ==
- Boundary (topology)
- Volume form, for volumes of surfaces in E^{n}
- Poincaré metric, for metric properties of Riemann surfaces
- Roman surface
- Boy's surface
- Tetrahemihexahedron
- Crumpled surface, a non-differentiable surface obtained by deforming (crumpling) a differentiable surface
