= EROC =

Eroc or EROC may refer to

- East Rutherford Operations Center, a facility of the Federal Reserve Bank of New York
- Enterprise Resource Outline Code, a concept in project management
- Eroc, stage name of German musician Joachim Heinz Ehrig
- EROC Australia, End Rape on Campus (Australia), major supporter of the #LetHerSpeak campaign
- Ethical Research Oversight Course, an online course
