= Closed figure =

In mathematics, a closed figure may refer to:

- Closed curve
- Closed surface
