= Banknote processing =

Automated process to check banknotes

Banknote processing is an automated process to check the security (or authenticity) features and the fitness of banknotes in circulation, to count and sort them by denomination and to balance deposits. This processing of currency is performed by security printing companies, central banks, financial institutions and cash-in-transit (CiT) companies.

== Cash Cycle ==
The cash cycle is driven by coins for lower values and banknotes for higher values (called denominations). The central bank orders the banknotes from security printing companies and stocks them. To get banknotes, financial institutions raise a credit at the central bank with paying interests and depositing securities. On request of their customers they pay them out over the bank counter or cash dispensers (i.e., automated teller machines, ATM) and put them into circulation. After paying at cash registers of retail or gas stations, vending machines (e.g., cigarettes, tickets, drinks) or depositing in ATMs the cash is returned to the financial institutions. In most cases, CiT companies pick up the cash receipts by armored cars and refill the cash dispensers or store it in bank vaults.

Depending on the country the cash cycle is regulated and structured differently. Some central banks (e.g., the Bank of England or the Reserve Bank of Australia) delegate their tasks for maintaining the fitness and checking the authenticity to the financial institutions and accept only unfit banknotes to be deposited (returned). Otherwise they may charge a penalty or a fee. The European Central Bank (ECB) stipulates that the financial institutions may always return the banknotes as standardized units (bundles of 1,000 banknotes, sorted by denomination, banded as packages of 100 banknotes) without having sorted them for the fitness level. The Deutsche Bundesbank (DBB) even accepts unsorted banknotes as "multi-denomination deposit" for a moderate fee independent from the amount of the payment. This attractive offering supports a high quality of the cash in circulation and the reliable and early detection of counterfeit money all over Germany. The National Bank of Belgium, the Oesterreichische Nationalbank with its participation in Geldservice Austria (GSA) and the Central Bank of Luxembourg apply similar models of the optimized cash cycle. There are various circulation schemes for the efficiency of the cash cycle.

The central banks define the conditions for the recirculation of fit banknotes by the financial institutions. The ECB, with its Decision on the authenticity and fitness checking and recirculation of euro banknotes (ECB/2010/14), defines a minimum standard for the recirculation of euro banknotes by financial institutions and other professional cash handlers. This includes the verification of authenticity and sufficient fitness level by certified banknote processing machines. Damaged and soiled banknotes must be returned to the National Central Bank (NCB). Suspect counterfeit money must be handed over to the competent national authorities.

== History ==
=== Counting machines ===
The sorting and counting of banknotes by mechanical means already existed in the 1920s. In 1916, the USA granted the patent Machine for Assorting and Counting Paper Money. The machine offered several slots for feeding banknotes by a cashier and used mechanical counters. It was used as Federal Bill Counter by the Federal Reserve System over several decades.

From 1957, the British De La Rue marketed the first counting machine based on spindle principles, i.e., with counting the pieces on the edges.

=== Sorting machines ===
When microelectronics became available by the end of the 1960s, the development of sorting machines started to check the authenticity and fitness of banknotes in one step. First prototypes were developed by Toshiba in Japan, by Crosfield Business Machines under the guidance of John Crosfield in the United Kingdom, by Società di Fisica Applicata (SFA) in Italy, and by Gesellschaft für Automation und Organisation (GAO), a subcompany of Giesecke+Devrient (G+D), in Germany under the guidance of Helmut Gröttrup. In 1976 the US company Recognition Equipment Inc (REI) joined. The demand was driven by the central banks, mainly Bank of Japan, Banca d'Italia, De Nederlandsche Bank and the German Deutsche Bundesbank. The sorting machines of the first generation achieved a processing speed of 4 up to 20 banknotes per second. In many cases they were built on the technology of reading punched cards or mail sorting or used synergies in manufacturing such machines.

The model ISS 300 of G+D was a product of the first generation and designed as a semi-automatic machine. It sorted the banknotes of a preselected denomination by authenticity and fitness, achieved a processing speed of 8 banknotes per seconds and was introduced by the Deutsche Bundesbank in 1977. It was manufactured until 2000 and set a world-wide reference of banknote processing systems with more than 2,100 sold systems to 67 countries. In 2006, an early machine was exhibited in the Deutsches Museum to demonstrate pattern recognition as an early application of information technology.

From 1985, the progress of microelectronics on base of microprocessors enabled banknote processing systems with a processing speed of up to 40 banknotes per second with fully automated functions of debanding, banding, bundling and online destruction by a paper shredder. The BPS 3000 from G+D was a second generation machine which dominated the market as fully automatic machine after achieving a large order from the US Federal Reserve in 1990 and replaced the Currency Verification and Counting System (CVCS) from REI. The Deutsche Bundesbank and further central banks followed. As variant BPS 2000 OBIS it became a world-wide standard for the final quality inspection of single notes in banknote printing works.

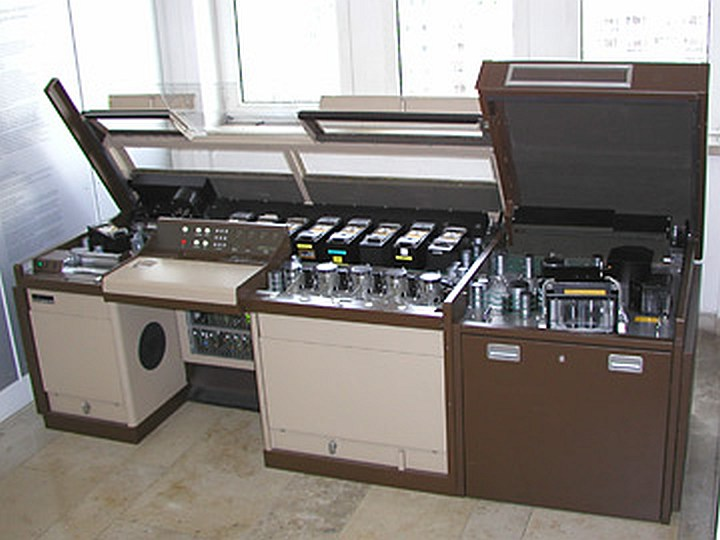
Banknote processing system ISS 300PS exhibited im Deutschen Museum (1986/2006)

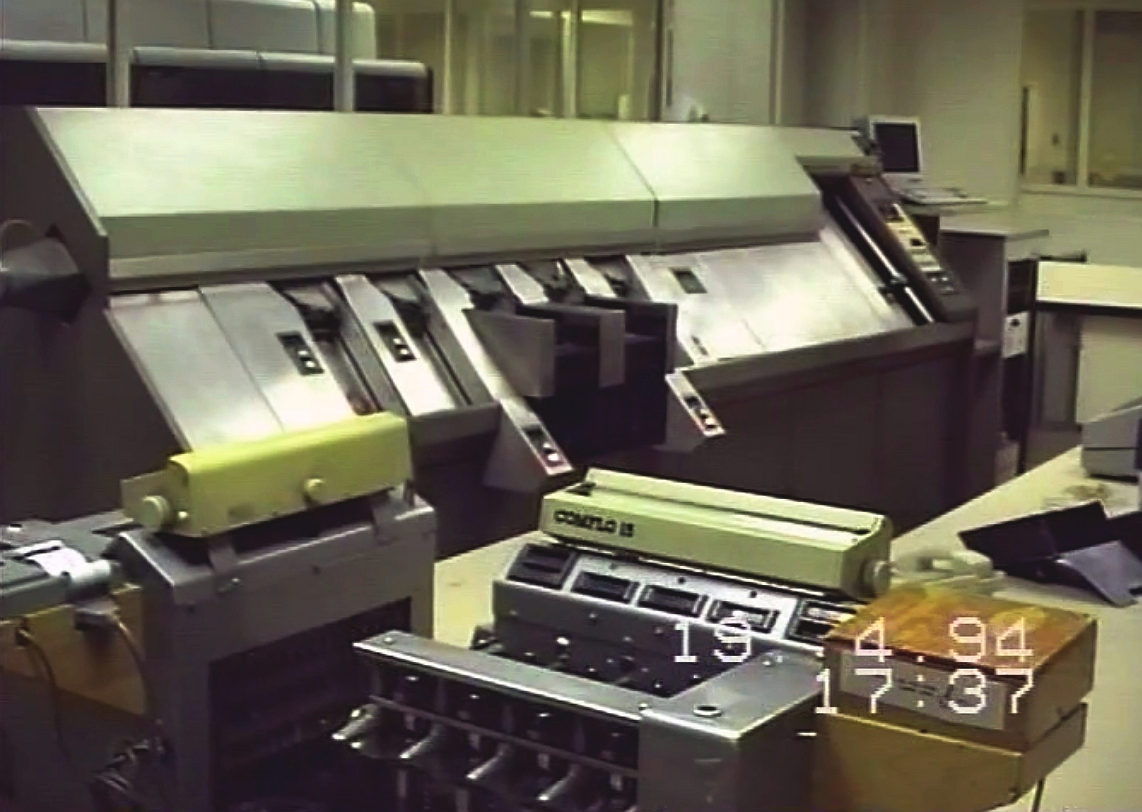
REI CVCS banknote processing system with Federal Bill Counter (1994)

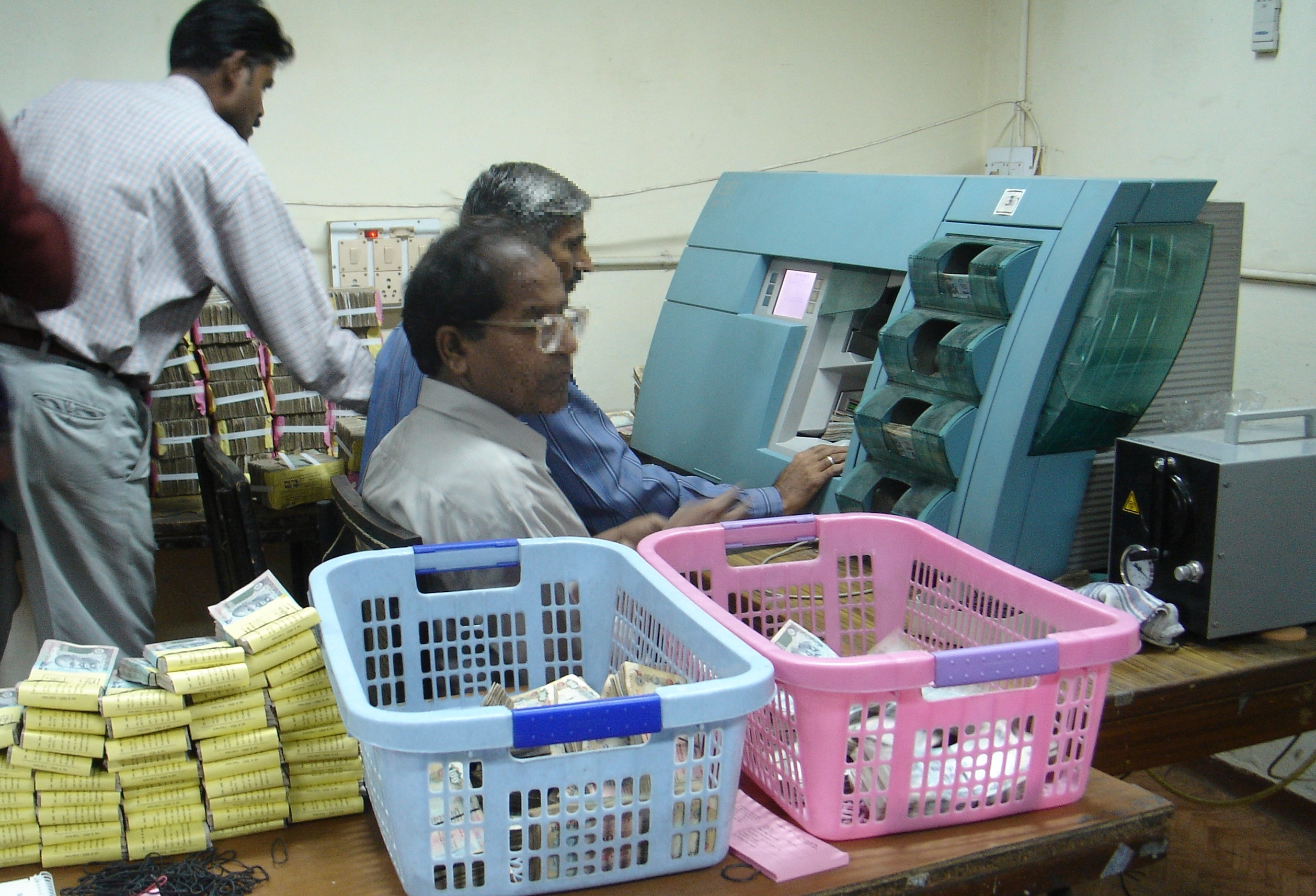
Banknote processing in an Indian cash center with BPS 200 from G+D (2004)

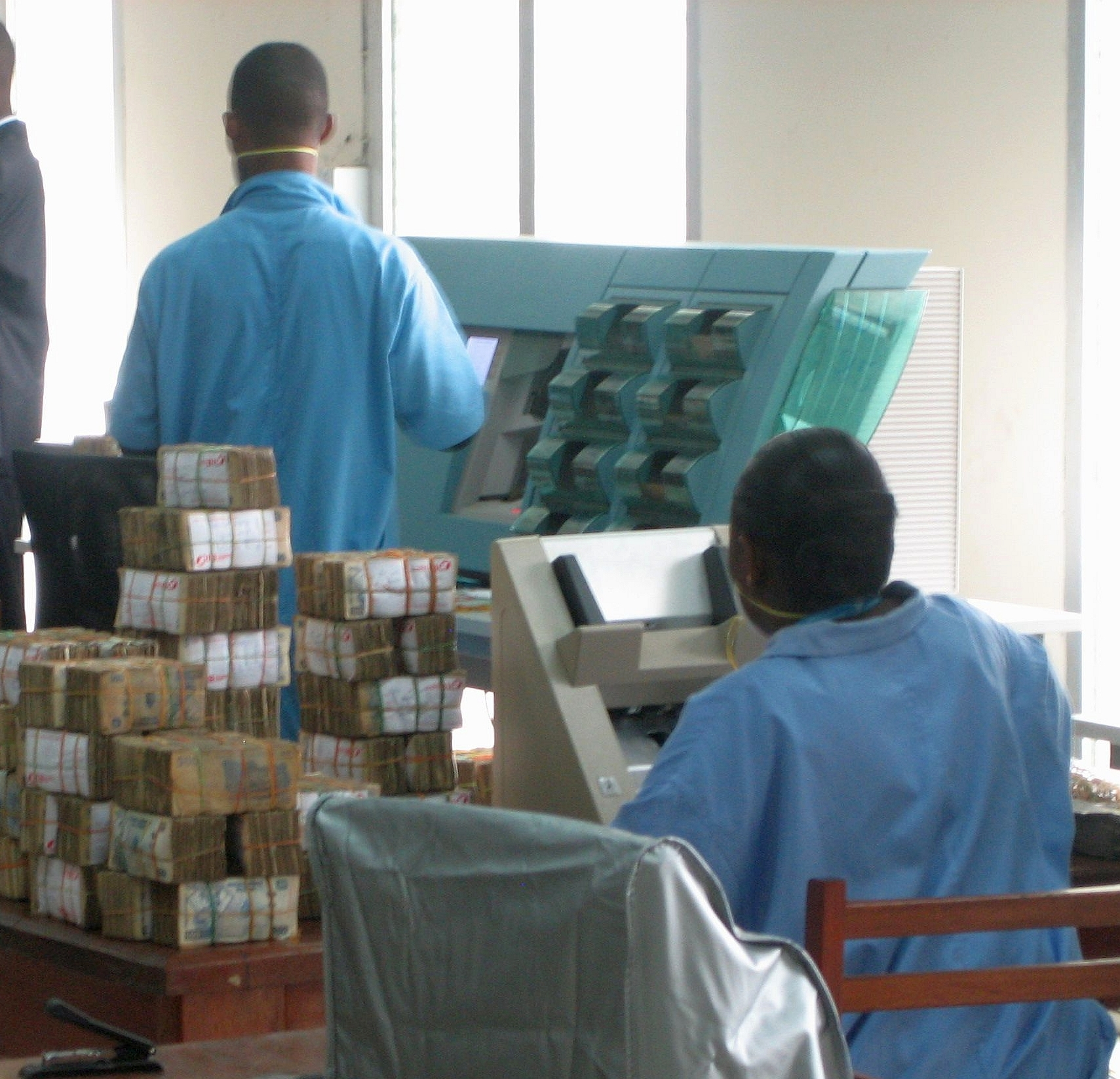
Banknote processing in the Democratic Republic of the Congo with BPS 200 and a DLR 8762 tabletop sorter from De La Rue (2010)

== Functions of banknote processing ==
The machines for banknote processing offer different levels of automation with a processing speed of up to 44 banknotes per second.

=== Automated feeding ===
With the highest automation level the banknotes are automatically fed to the singler by using the following principles:

- Feeding of printed sheets of paper with up to 60 banknotes in security printing into a cutting system and subsequent filling of circulating carriers with up to 1,000 loose banknotes each
- Feeding of loose banknotes from standardized trays
- Feeding of packaged banknotes by automated opening of parcels and bundles (e.g., a carton or a shrink wrapped parcel of 10 bundles with 10 packages of 100 banknotes)
- Debanding of the packages by cutting and removing the currency straps

=== Singler ===
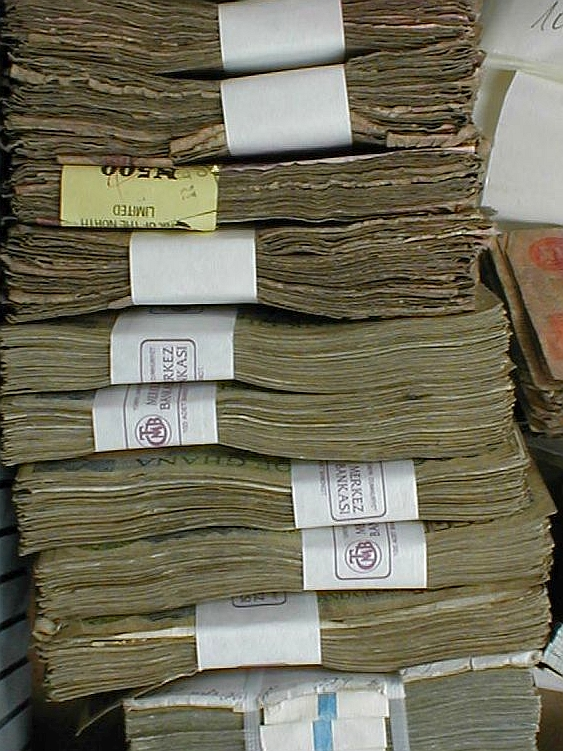
Quality of banknotes in circulation in Nigeria (2000)

The singler pulls single banknotes from a stack. Simple machines are using the friction principle (friction singler), grip them at the long edge and transport, and evaluate and sort them by a short-edge transport. High-speed machines additionally use compressed air and suction, grip the banknotes at the short edge (long-edge transport) and bring them within milliseconds to a speed of up to 11 m/s (approx. 40 km/h or 25 miles/hour). This banknotes are accelerated by more than 500-fold earth gravity (i.e., >5,000 m/s^{2}).

A special challenge is the singling of banknotes with poor quality, e.g., due to limpness, soiling, mechanical defects, glued by adhesive tape or chewing gum, often distorted by long storage, or high moisture.

By using separator cards or header cards, different deposits can be accounted separately without interrupting the singling.

=== Detectors ===
The currency detectors specialized for high-speed processing check each single banknote for the following features:

- Detecting the denomination, series and orientation, e.g., distinguishing euro banknotes between series ES1 and ES2 or sorting US dollar for faced orientation
- Reading the serial number for statistical purposes, if applicable for the search of blackmail money
- Checking the authenticity of banknote based on machine-readable security features
- Determining the fitness for recirculation by evaluating soil, stains, ink wear, and mechanical damages (e.g., tearing, holes, adhesive tapes, dog ears, missing parts, fold, crumpling, limpness)
- Detecting dyed banknotes which were neutralized by an Intelligent Banknote Neutralisation System (IBNS), e.g., when a stolen ATM cassette was opened without authorization

Optical and other physical measuring systems are used to detect these characteristics. Security features of banknotes are strictly covert with regard to composition and detection principles.

Banknotes which cannot be verified as genuine are rejected to a special output pocket for manual inspection. This also applies for multiple items if the singler pulls more than one banknote at once. The machine operator can refeed them to the singler or check the human-readable authenticity features for verification.

=== Stacking and packaging ===
The processed banknotes are output to various stackers depending on the evaluated category. In general stackers with spiral slots are used to receive the banknotes, decelerate them on shortest distance (<200 mm) and stack them.

Depending on the degree of automation the stacking may comprise the following steps:

- Separation (sorting) by denomination, series, orientation and fitness level (optionally including differentation for ATM fitness and standard fitness for circulation)
- Counting and stacking as loose banknotes
- Transfer of loose banknotes into special trays
- Banding as output packages with 100 banknotes. The currency strap is 25 to 40 mm wide and is printed with processing data. As strapping requires some time two alternating stackers (tandem operation) are assigned to one sorting category.
- Pre-packaging of bundles with 5 or 10 output packages for a unit of 500 or 1,000 banknotes, optionally with a label printed with processing data
- Bundling of the units by a packaging machinery with using shrink wrap or vacuum packing. This procedure protects the banknotes from soil and dirt and prevents the theft of single banknotes.
- Aggregation of 4 to 20 bundles with using shrink wrap or carton (secondary packaging)
- Automated palletizing by a robot

=== Destruction ===
The destruction of unfit or recalled banknotes is a responsibility of the central bank. In general, the destruction is performed by a shredder. The machine cross-cuts the banknotes to particles (shreds) with an area of less than 25 mm^{2}. This work process is executed under very high security provisions to preclude manipulation of authenticity detection and counting. Optionally, digital signatures are used to protect the application software and transmission of counting data.

In a second stage the shreds are collected by a special suction system and briquetted to reduce the volume. The briquettes may be disposed of in a landfill or burnt for heat generation. Some central banks offer shreds as a popular souvenir.

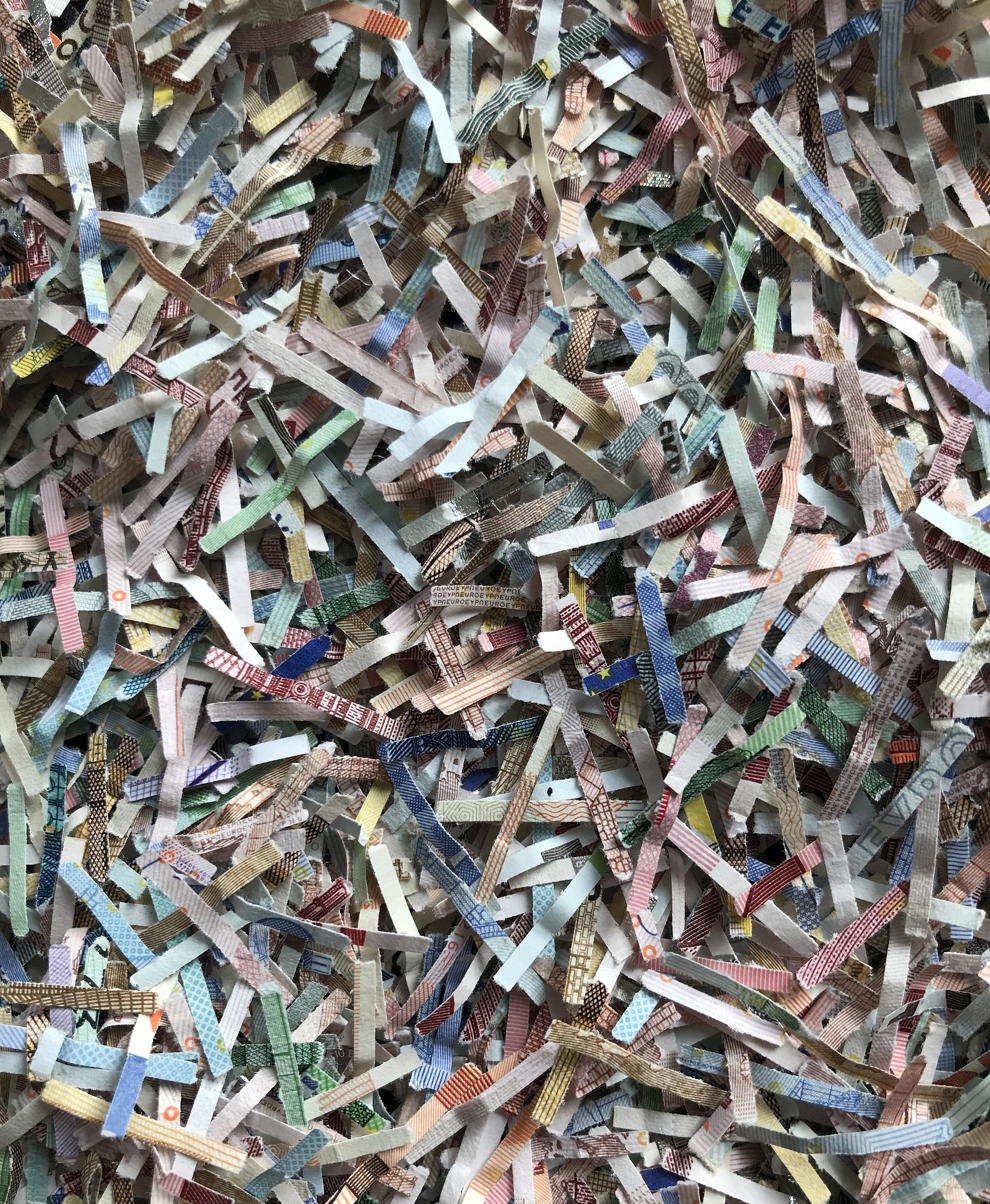
Shreds of euro banknotes (series ES2) with a typical size of 1.5 x 14 mm²

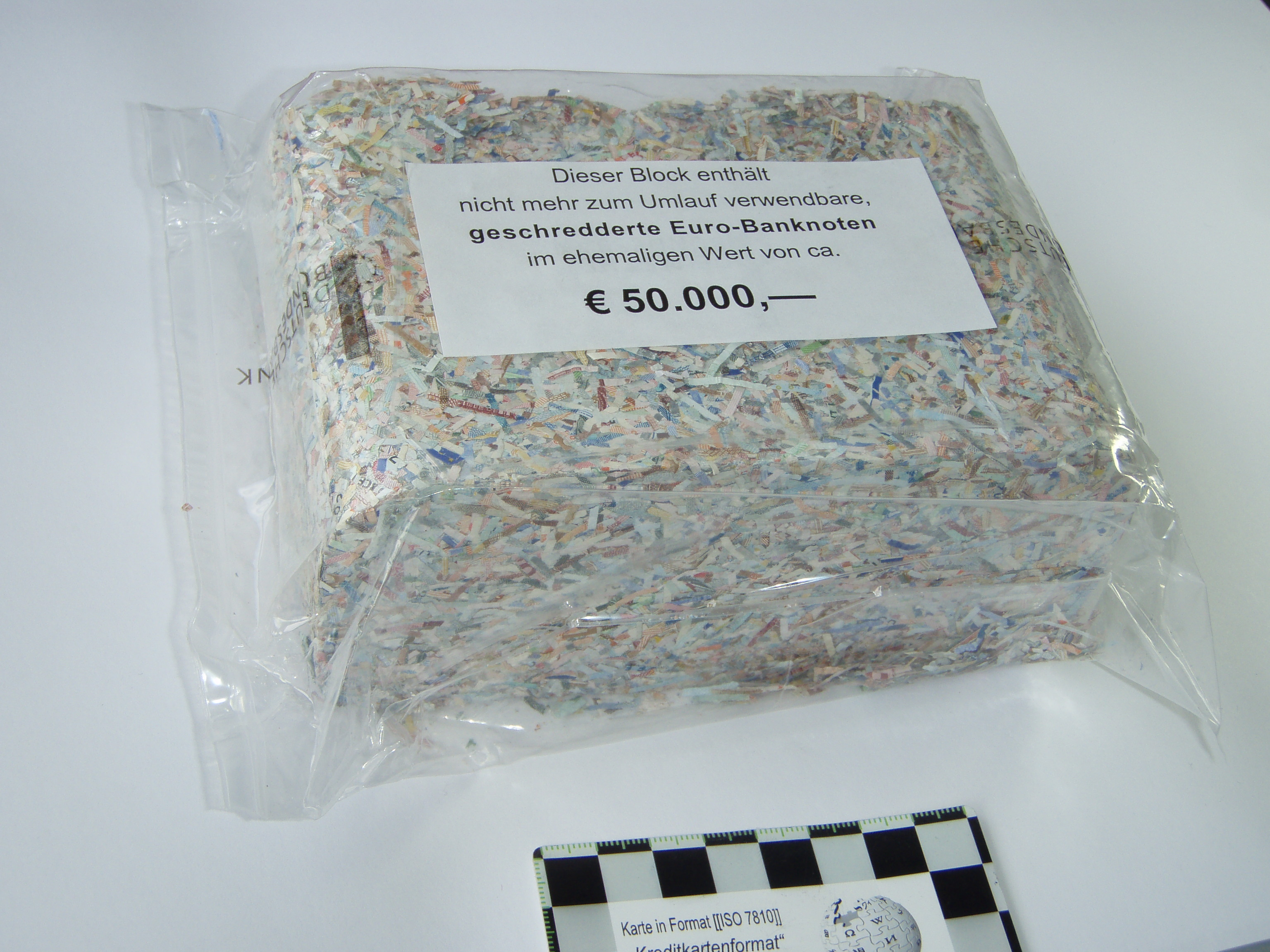
Briquetted euro banknotes by Deutsche Bundesbank (approx. 1 kg)

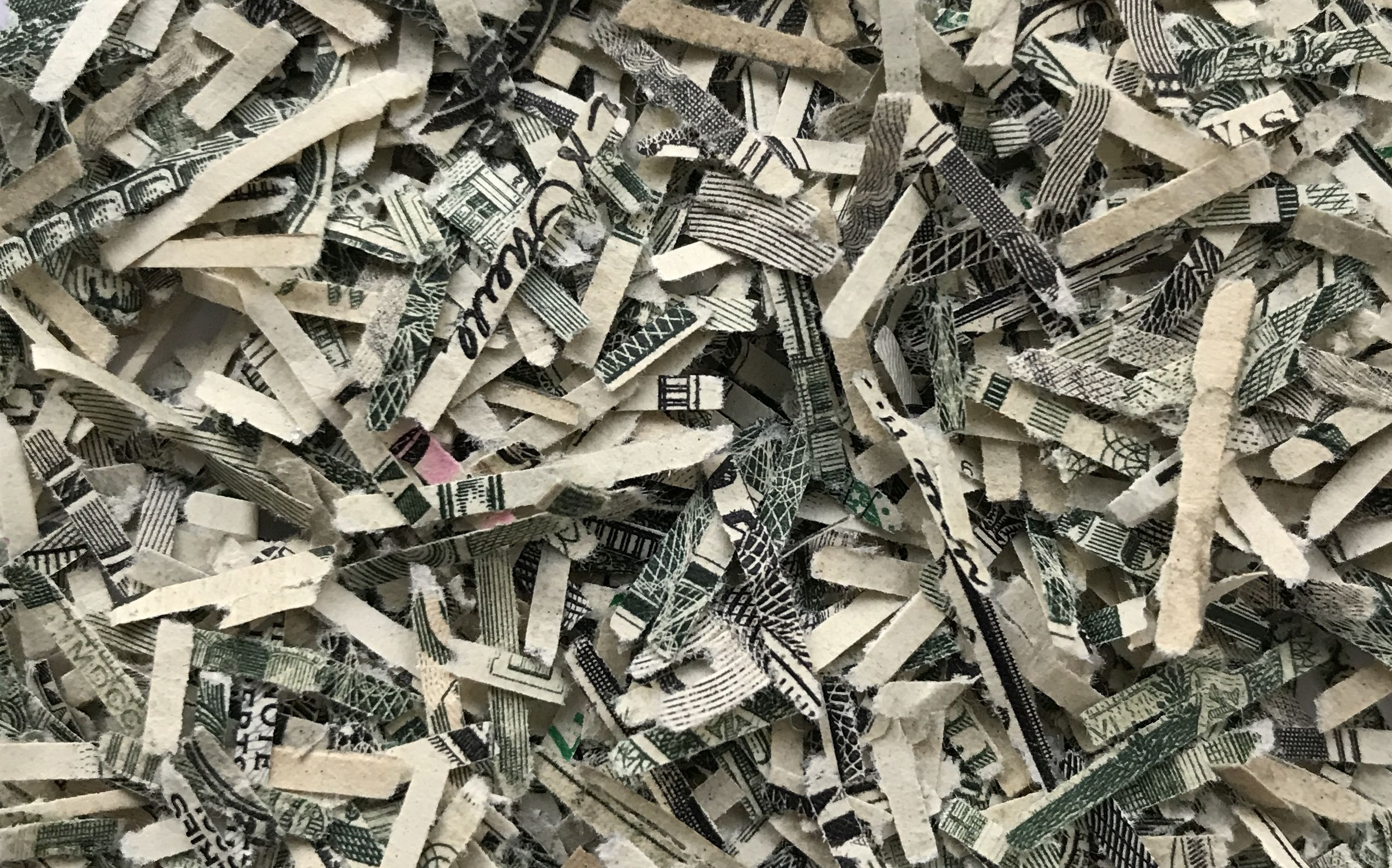
Shredded US dollar with a typical size of 1.5 × 14 mm²

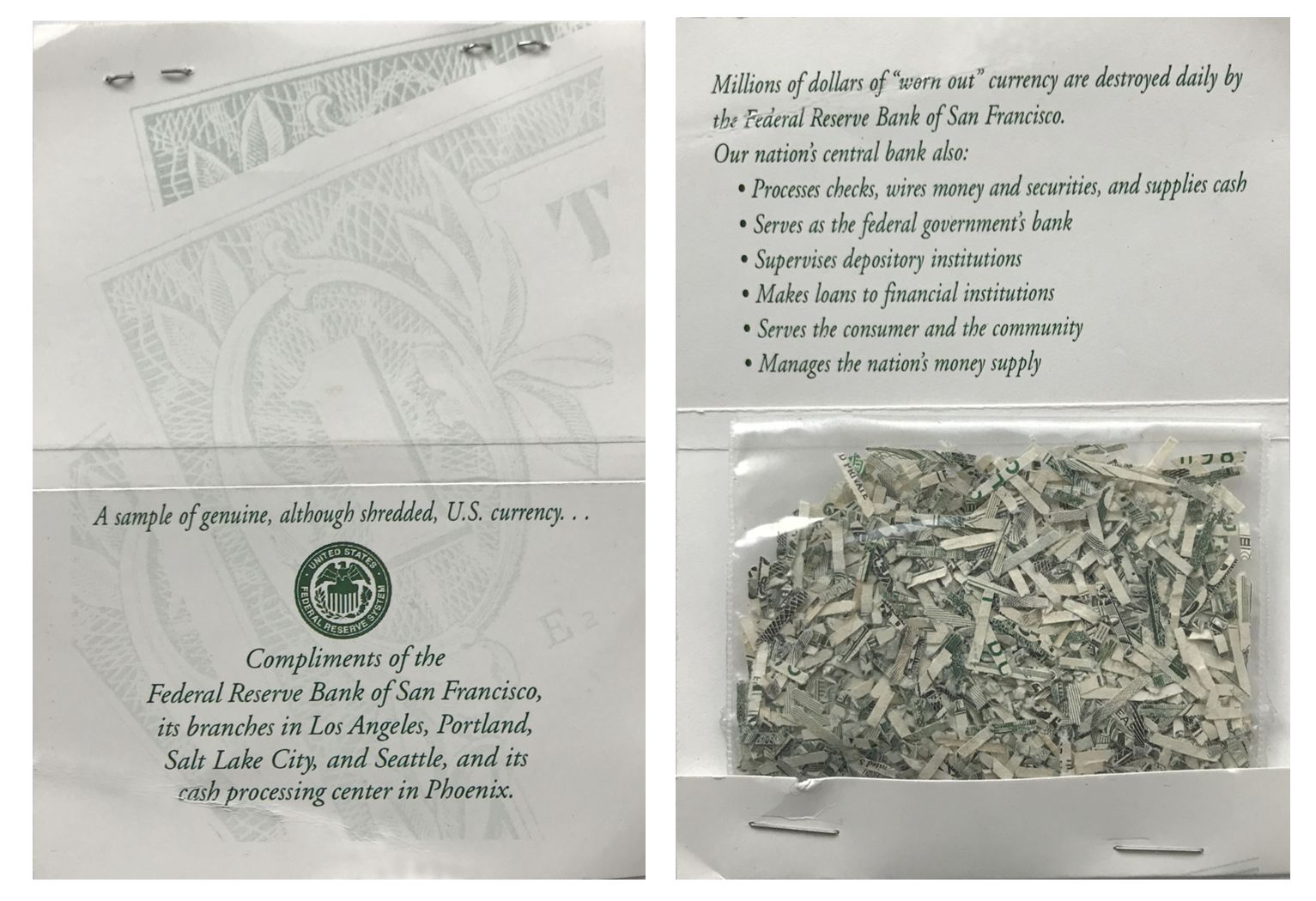
Shredded US dollar by Federal Reserve Bank of San Francisco as souvenir

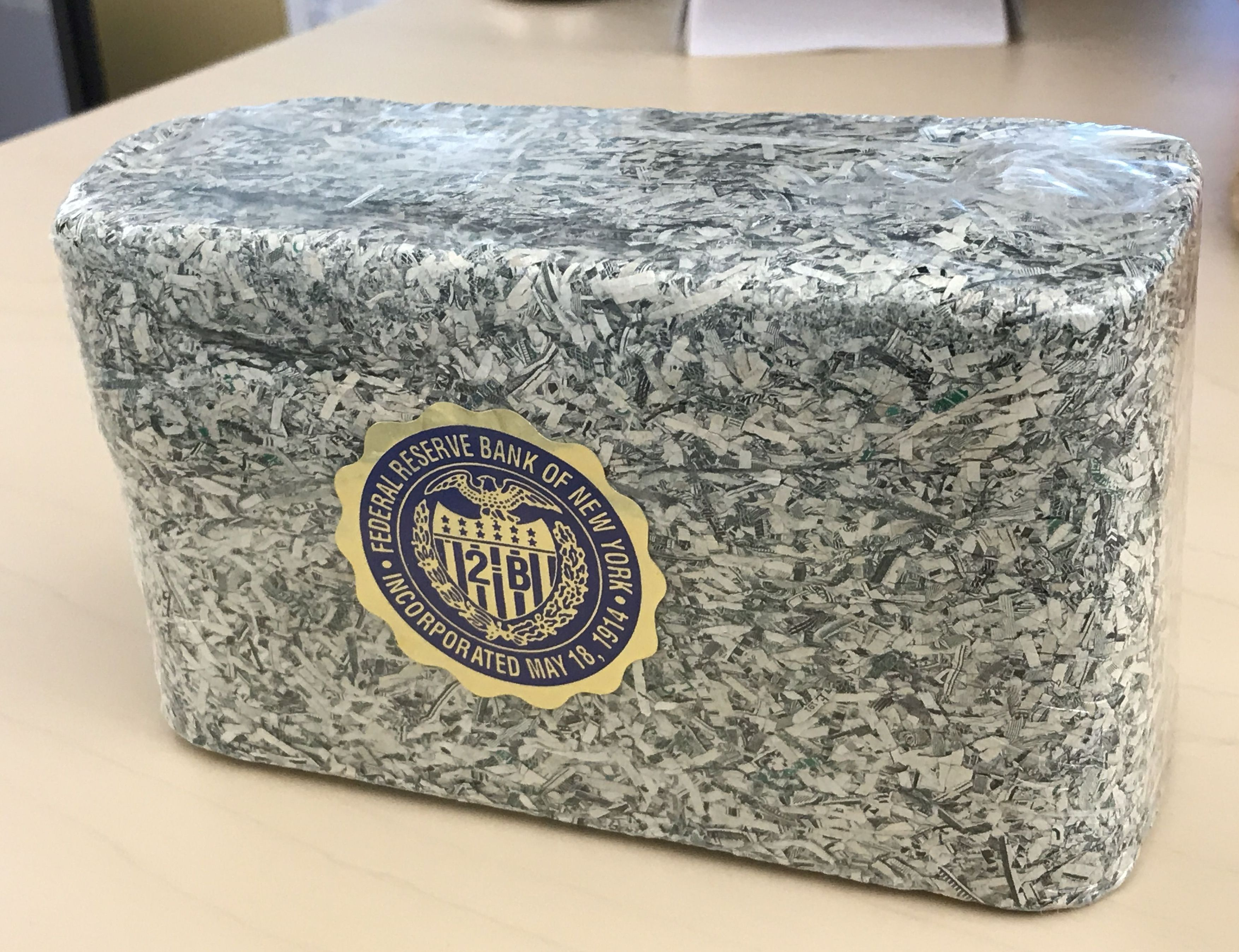
Briquetted US dollar by Federal Reserve Bank of New York (approx. 1,000 pieces, 1 kg)

== Market and manufacturers ==
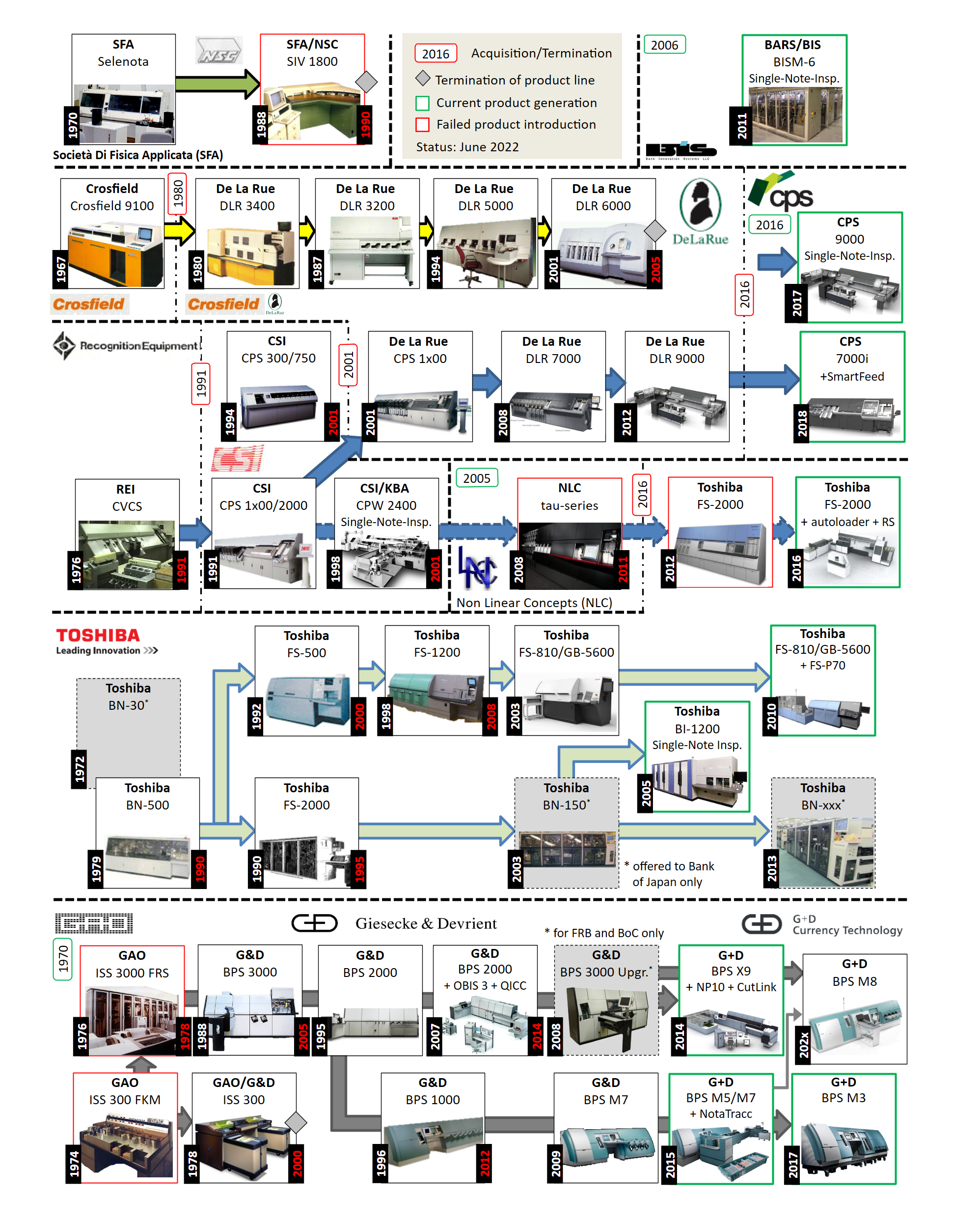
Genealogy of high-speed processing systems (1967–2022)

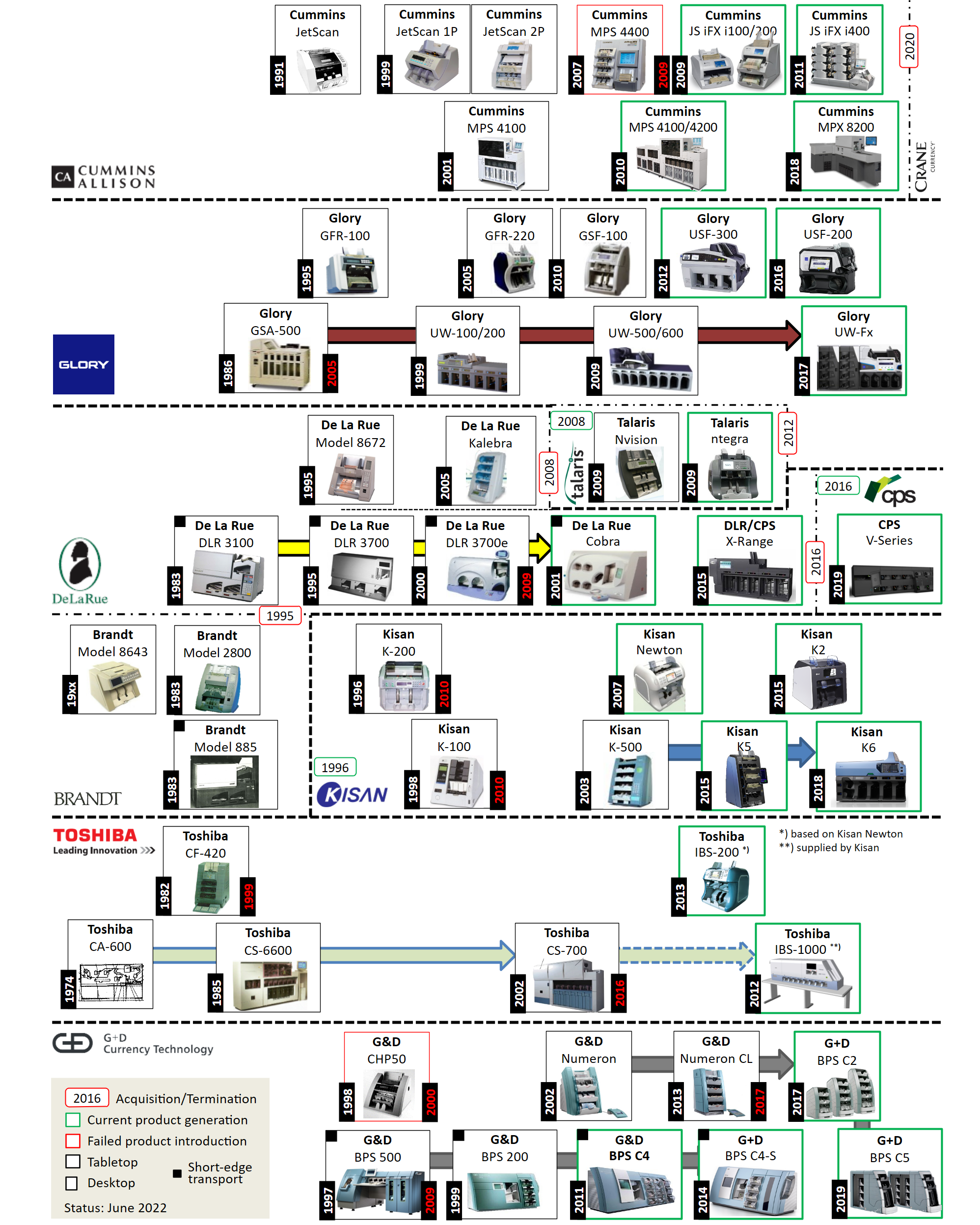
Genealogy of desktop and tabletop processing systems (1974–2022)

Since 1995 the offering of banknote processing machines has differentiated to the following product classes:

- Modular high-speed systems with a high degree of automation and a processing speed of more than 20 banknotes per second with up to 20 output stackers for the concurrent processing of mixed denominations (multi-denomination processing) or mixed currencies
- Modular desktop systems for mid-range performance (mainly used by cash centers of CiT companies and financial institutions)
- Compact tabletop systems with up to 4 output stackers for the use in the back office of a retail or commercial bank branch
- Simple tabletop systems for the cashier for counting and low-level authenticity verification (no sorting)

The preeminent market leader for high-speed systems is the German Giesecke+Devrient (G+D), followed by the Japanese Toshiba and the British-American Cash Processing Solutions (CPS) with low market shares. The CPS products are based on the technology of Recognition Equipment Inc. (REI), which was acquired by Currency Systems International (CSI) in 1990, by De La Rue in 2002 and divested to CPS in 2016. In January 2023, CPS announced to withdraw from this market segment and is focusing on service and software business instead.

The Japanese Glory, followed by G+D and several Chinese, Korean and Japanese suppliers, leads the desktop and compact tabletop market.

Super-large cash centers have a capacity of processing up to 20 million banknotes per day. They are protected by the highest security provisions to protect from heists. The world-wide largest cash centers are:

- Federal Reserve Bank of New York: East Rutherford Operations Center (EROC) with high-speed systems from G+D, operational since 1992. For the first time it used an automated storage and retrieval system (AS/RS) and automated guided vehicles (AGV).
- Bank of Japan: Center in Toda (North of Tokyo) with high-speed systems from Toshiba, operational since 1993. It has a very high degree of automation with nearly unmanned operation from the deposited to the withdrawn parcel, using conveyor belts and packaging machinery.
- People's Bank of China: Several large cash centers in metropolitan areas, mainly with high-speed processing systems from G+D, operational since 2003
- Deutsche Bundesbank: Cash center in Dortmund, operational since July 2021. It is using a high degree of automation with a standardized "P-Behälter" and relies on conveyors belts, automated guided vehicles and packaging systems.
- Central Bank of Egypt: security printing, paper mill and highly automated cash center in the New Administrative Capital with a daily capacity of processing 20 million banknotes, operational since 2022

== Related technologies ==
Banknote processing is a special application of document processing for currency based on security paper or polymer. Therefore some manufacturers tried adapting existing technology for banknote processing, especially for the singling and image scanner. Such applications comprised:

- Punched card sorter: Reading of binary encoded information and sorting of punched cards, see also Hollerith machines
- Checks: Reading of checks (or cheques) by magnetic ink character recognition (MICR) and sorting for the paying financial institutions. In 2000, the US Federal Reserve System processed more checks (approx. 40 billion per year) than banknotes. Since 2003, with Check 21 Act and check truncation, the full image scanning of checks is used and physical return if the checks to the paying financial institution is no longer necessary.
- Vouchers and coupons: Reading of documents with a defined value, mainly used in casinos and retail. In some countries food coupons are used to subsidize the deserving poor.
- Medical prescriptions: Scanning and reading of printed documents for central accounting with health insurance companies
- Mail sorting: Reading the address of letters and sorting by the postal code. Modern systems are capable of sorting the letters according to the detailed sequence of destinations for the distribution by the mailman.

Meanwhile these applications are differentiated because the requirements for banknote processing are quite special. Only Toshiba is offering banknote processing and mail sorting machinery from the same division.

== Patents ==
One of the first comprehensive patent applications was filed by the Italian Societá di Fisica Applicata (SFA) on May 31, 1972, as "Automatic Used Banknote Selecting Machine". It described an apparatus for the detection of counterfeits (by watermark, fluorescence and intaglio printing), the measuring of the wearing by comparison with a sample banknote, and the reading of the serial number. SFA developed the machine Selenota which was used by the central banks of Italy and Spain until the early 1980s. The patent US 3,800,155 which was granted on March 26, 1974, was easily avoided due to weak claims and only had little market impact.

In the 1990s, the US company Cummins Allison Corp. installed a comprehensive patent protection for tabletop machines, especially for the combination of short-edge transport with a processing speed of more than 800 banknotes per minute. In 2003 it filed infringement lawsuits against Japanese Glory and Korean Shinwoo for compensation of the damage and fine with several tens of million US dollar. With this success Cummins Allison could seal the US market of tabletop machines off from competition until the main patents expired in 2017.

Meanwhile the relevant basic patent have expired for all product segments. Therefore manufacturers from China and Russia have tried to enter the market of high-speed machines by copied technology, but with little success due to issues of product quality.

== Literature and media ==
- Criminal fiction Montecristo from Martin Suter describing a white-collar crime by unauthorized printing of Swiss franc
- Documentary film Tonbridge Securitas Heist on Securitas depot robbery in Tonbridge, Kent, with a prey of £53.1m in 2006
- Action film Den of Thieves with a fictional raid on a cash transport and the Los Angeles branch of the Federal Reserve Bank of San Francisco. The scenery of banknote processing does not correspond to the principle of FRB operations.

== See also ==
- Automated cash handling
- Automated teller machine
- Ticket machine
- Slot machine
