= Hella (company) =

German automotive part supplier

Hella GmbH & Co. KGaA
- Type: Public
- Traded as: FWB: HLE; MDAX
- Industry: Automotive parts
- Founded: 1899; 127 years ago
- Founder: Sally Windmüller
- Headquarters: Lippstadt, Germany
- Number of locations: 125
- Area served: Worldwide
- Products: Automotive parts
- Revenue: 7,954,140,000 (2023)
- Operating income: 464,030,000 (2023)
- Net income: 263,920,000 (2023)
- Total assets: 7,061,640,000 (2023)
- Owner: Forvia (81.6%)
- Number of employees: 37,770 (December 2023)
- Website: www.hella.com

Hella GmbH & Co. KGaA is an internationally operating German automotive parts supplier headquartered in Lippstadt, North Rhine-Westphalia. The company develops and manufactures lighting, electronic components, and systems for the automotive industry. It also operates one of the largest trade organizations for automotive parts, accessories, diagnostics, and services within Europe.

Hella is one of the top 50 global automotive suppliers, and one of the 100 largest industrial companies in Germany. Hella has approximately 37,000 employees at over 125 locations worldwide and generated consolidated sales of €8.1 billion in fiscal year 2024.

In 2022, the company merged with French global automotive supplier Faurecia, the merged business being named Forvia, and the two divisions being formally called Forvia Hella and Forvia Faurecia. The products of Hella GmbH & Co. KGaA will continue to be sold under its own brand.

== History ==
Sally Windmüller founded the company in 1899 under the name Westfälische Metall-Industrie Aktien-Gesellschaft (WMI) to produce ball horns, candles, and kerosene lamps for carriages.

Hella's name first appeared in 1908 as a trademark for acetylene headlights. In 1923, the manufacturing family Lüdenscheider Hueck took over the majority of the shares. The name "Hella" was included in the company name in 1986. The most likely explanation for the Hella brand is attributed to Sally Windmüller: He wanted to honor his wife, Helen, in short Hella, and also wanted to use the playful association between this name and the German word heller (brighter).

After World War II, the company started to expand, so in 1951 the first subsidiary company was founded in Wembach. Today Hella has six different production manufacturers in Germany, which are located in Lippstadt, Bremen, Recklinghausen, Hamm (Bockum-Hövel), Nellingen, and Wembach.

Early internationalization and the creation of a global distribution network in the 1960s resulted in the company developing one of the largest distribution networks in the industry, including its subsidiaries and partners in numerous markets worldwide. In 1961, for example, the first foreign production plant was founded in Mentone, Australia. Today, Hella has more than 100 locations in over 35 countries and is operates in the economic regions of Europe, NAFTA/South America, Africa, and Asia/Pacific.

Since the early 1990s Hella has also been part of several Joint Ventures with other automotive part suppliers. Those Joint Ventures help develop other fields of competence. At the moment Hella cooperates with several different companies, such as Mahle Behr, Plastic Omnium, Samlip, Leoni, Mando, TMD Friction, and, innocent. Joint Ventures are, for example, HBPO and BHTC in Lippstadt. Furthermore, the holding "Hella Stanley Ltd Pty" with Stanley Electric was founded in 2002 and is located in Melbourne.

In 2008, Hella started a joint venture between Hella and Gutmann Messtechnik, diagnostic specialists, to devote more attention to this area. Also in 2008, it was announced that the company would pay more attention in the future to issues and items that are outside the traditional automotive domain. That same year, Hella sold its Danish subsidiary Holger Christiansen A/S to the automotive supplier Bosch.

Because of strong economical fluctuation, Hella recorded a loss in the fiscal year 2005/06. Their management decided for a program to lower the costs and increase efficiency so that in the following fiscal year 2006/07 an operational gain could be recorded. In the fiscal year 2007/08 this operational gain increased again. Furthermore, Hella recorded the second highest consolidated sale of 4,4 billion Euros In the following fiscal years, a constant growth was recorded, which reached 5,3 billion euros in 2013/14.

Since 2017, Hella has spun off Brighter AI Technologies and Yptokey from their incubator.

In 2021, French automotive supplier Faurecia agreed to acquire the Hueck family's 60 per cent majority stake in Hella for €3.4 billion and announced an offer for the remaining shares at €60 per share, valuing the company at a total of €6.7 billion. The takeover agreement for the 60% stake was concluded on 15 August 2021. Faurecia purchased half of the remaining shares in August 2022, bringing its stake in Hella to 80%.

== Products and services ==
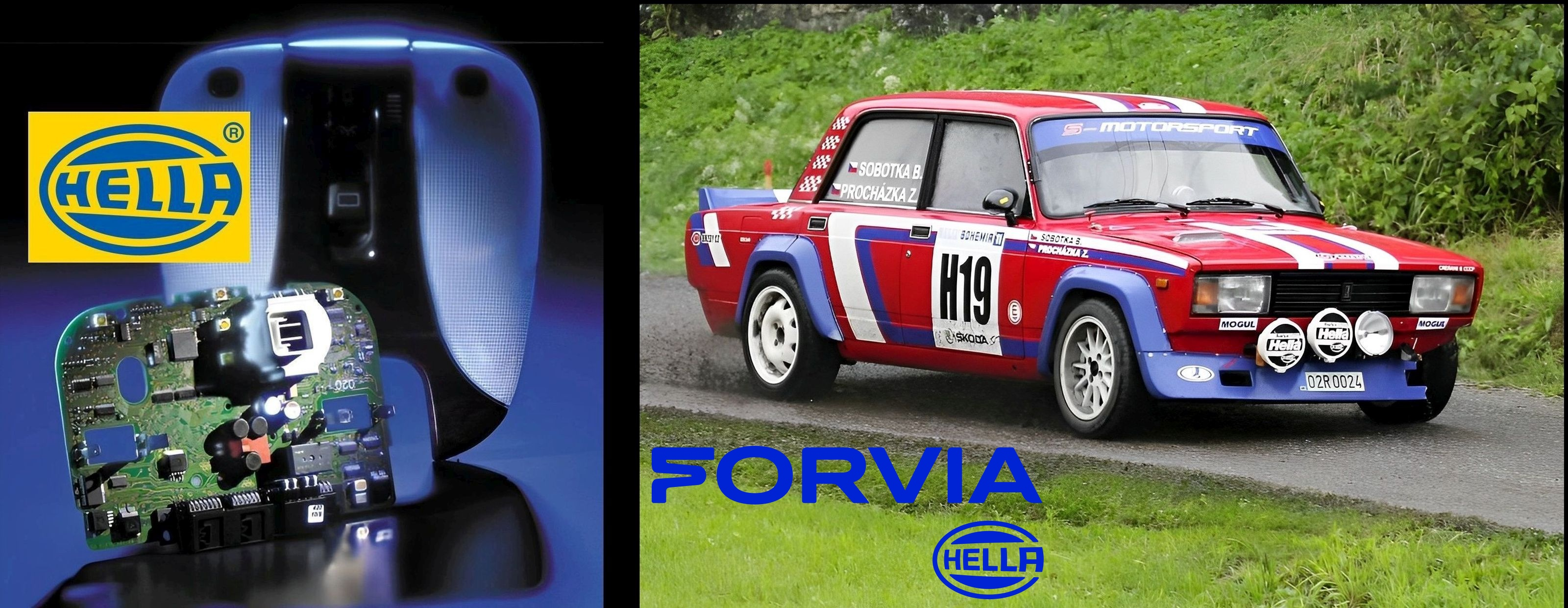
A module and a rally car with mounted Hella driving lights, old and new logo

The main businesses of Hella can be divided into three segments: Automotive, Aftermarket, and Special Applications. The Automotive Segment consists of the development, production, and marketing of lighting and electronic components and systems both for vehicle manufacturers and for other suppliers. In the Aftermarket Segment, the company develops, produces, and markets products for the independent aftermarket and for garages. The Special Applications Segment serves target groups ranging from the producers of construction machinery through boat builders right up to municipalities and energy suppliers by providing them with innovative lighting and electronic products.

In the lighting division, Hella develops and manufactures headlamps, rear lamps, and interior lighting. Recent innovations include headlights that adapt to the prevailing driving and weather situations. Headlamps with LEDs as light sources for low beam and high beam are already produced in series. An example would be the beams in the Cadillac Escalade Platinum. As daytime running lights, they are in many middle- and upper-class vehicles, often included as standard.

Systems to increase efficiency and safety and comfort systems dominate the electronic product portfolio. These include Data-enabled electronic control units and roof modules as complex light-electronic modules, as well as Vehicle access and driving authorization. Modules for power management to optimise the energy balance of the electrical system and improve the battery charge balance. Innovation and growth areas are electronic driver assistance systems. With infrared (lidar), 24-GHz radar and camera, and ultrasonic sensors, Hella offers here a technology portfolio and the corresponding series experience. Another important business segment is electronic components such as position sensors, actuators, vacuum pumps, and wash water systems.

Hella sells automotive parts and accessories with its own sales companies and partners in more than 100 countries. Hella supplies the automotive aftermarket and garages with parts ranging in the core areas of lighting, electrical, electronics and thermal management.

In addition to car accessories designed for civilian cars, Hella also manufactures special signalling for official emergency vehicles. These include flash beacons and beacons (in blue and yellow), Visual Warning Systems (OWS), and all-around sound combinations (RTK). These are compact roof structures that combine the two blue lights, sirens, and possibly several additional issues. Police, emergency services, fire departments, agencies for technical aid, and numerous other operators of deployment use special vehicles made by them. Also part of the product range of authorities, are headlights on the bumper and some other products (e.g., covert special signal for civilian emergency vehicles).

In the 'Industries' segment Hella transfers existing technologies from the automotive sector to new target groups. As a first pilot project, some cities in China have been provided with these new street lights. Another project is the LED-airport beacons, which can be found at the airports of Luxembourg, Paderborn/Lippstadt, and Stavanger. Despite, new components for LED-interior lighting are being offered.

In 2012 Hella started a cooperation with the Chinese automobile manufacturer BAIC to develop and produce light systems, particularly designed for the Chinese market.

In 2017 Hella partnered with Air-Quality Data Company BreezoMeter

== Shareholder structure ==
(as at 31 December 2023)

Personally liable partner: Hella Geschäftsführungsgesellschaft mbH

Limited partners:

- Forvia SE - 80.59%
- Elliott Investment Management LP (Paul Singer (businessman)) - 9.91%
- Artisan Partners LP- 2,76%
- Public - 6,74%.

== See also ==
- Charging station
- Inductive charging
- Electric vehicle
