= Giesecke+Devrient =

German company

Giesecke+Devrient GmbH

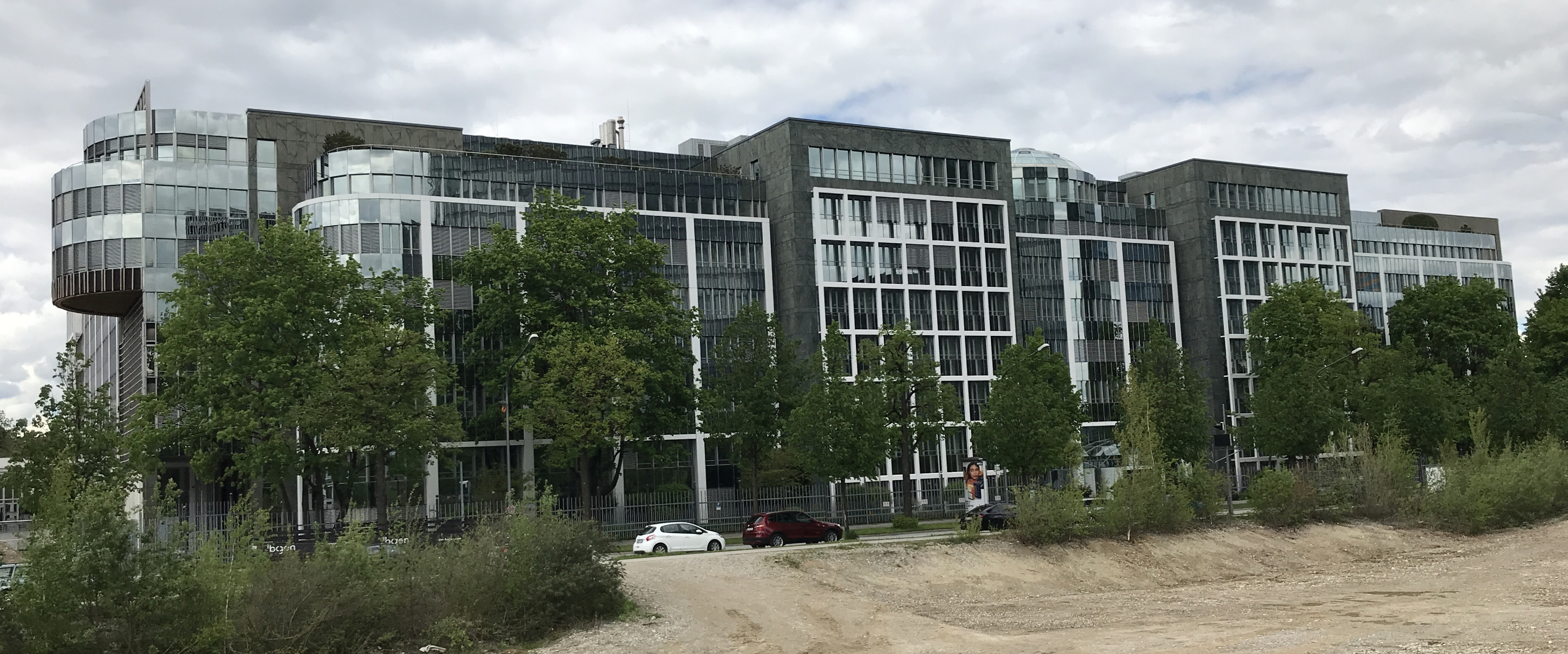
- Headquarter of Giesecke+Devrient in Munich
- Type: Gesellschaft mit beschränkter Haftung
- Industry: Security Technology
- Founded: June 1, 1852; 174 years ago in Leipzig, Kingdom of Saxony
- Founder: Hermann Giesecke; Alphonse Devrient
- Headquarters: Munich, Germany
- Number of locations: 123 locations in 40 countries (2024)
- Key people: Ralf Wintergerst (CEO); Klaus Josef Lutz (Chairman of the Board)
- Products: Euro banknotes; Security Technology
- Revenue: €3,132 billion (2024)
- Number of employees: 14,435 (2024)
- Website: www.gi-de.com

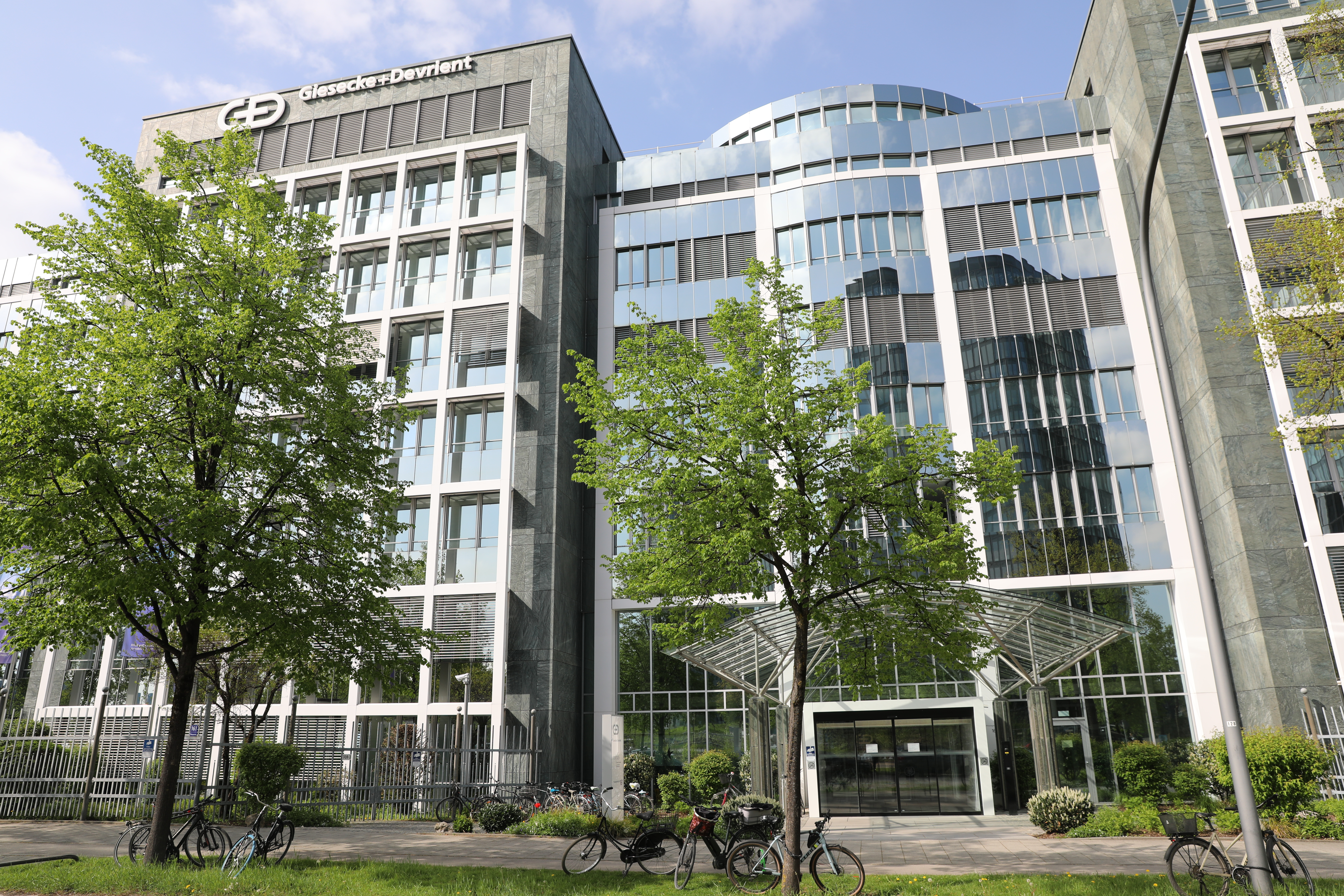
Main entrance G+D in Munich

Giesecke+Devrient GmbH (G+D) is a German international security technology company operating in the fields of digital security, financial platforms, and currency technology. Founded in 1852, the company evolved from a manufacturer of banknotes, substrates, banknote processing machines, securities, ID documents (such as national ID cards and passports), and payment cards to a provider of security technologies in payment systems, identities, connectivity, and digital infrastructures. The company's headquarters are located in Munich.

G+D operates in 40 countries worldwide and achieved sales of €3.13 billion in 2024. As of 2024, the company produces banknotes for 145 central banks globally.

== History ==
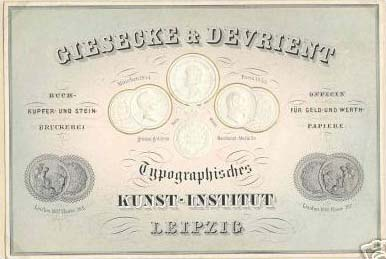
Old company advertisement of Giesecke & Devrient in Leipzig from the 1860s

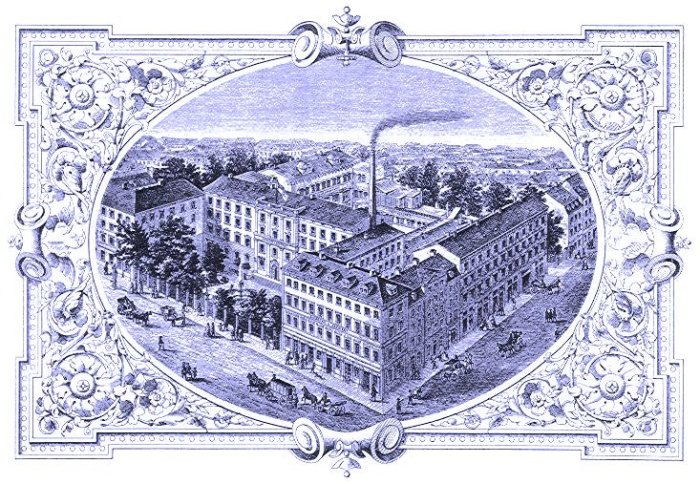
Company headquarters in Leipzig

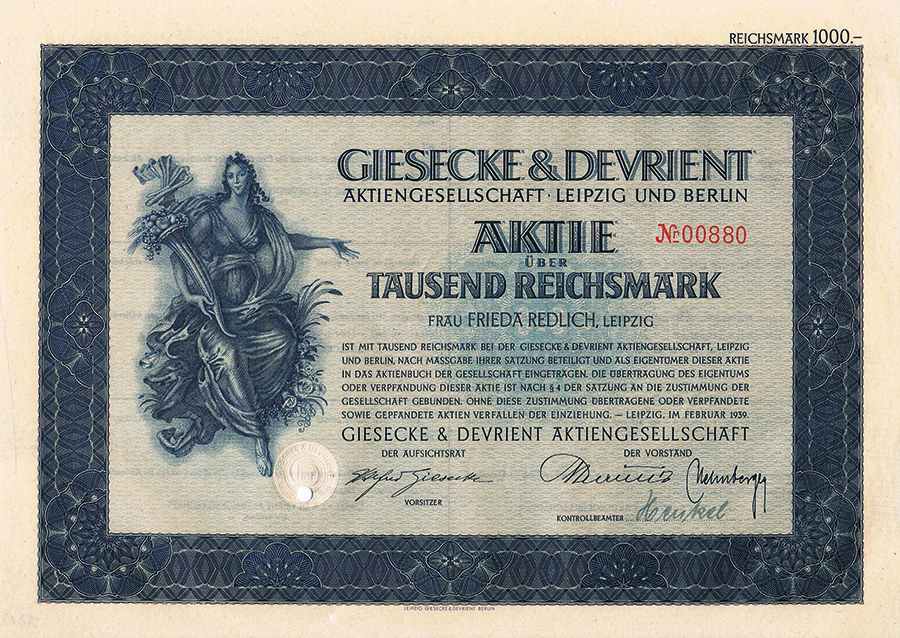
Giesecke & Devrient AG share, nominal value 1000 Reichsmark, 1939

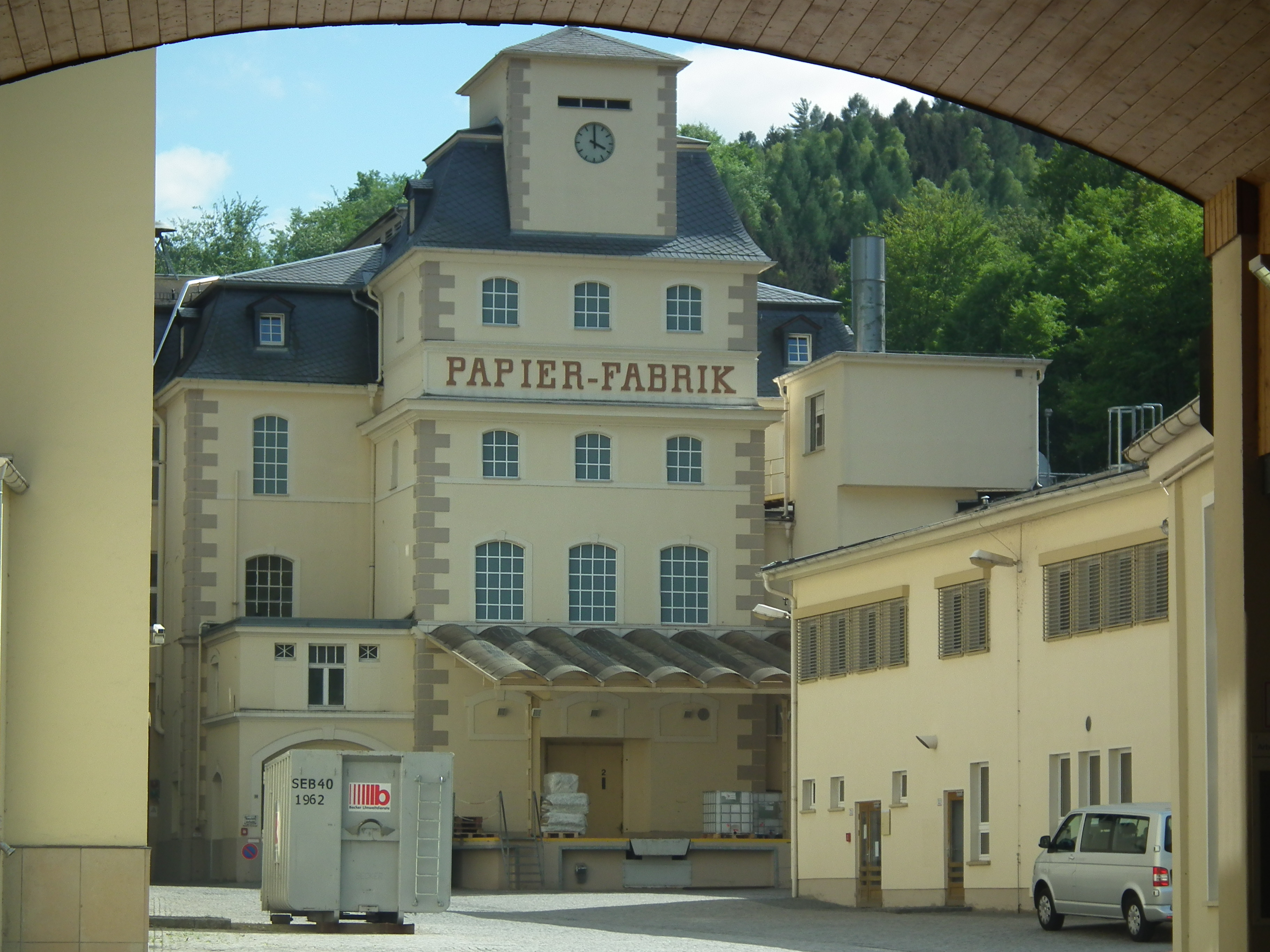
Louisenthal paper mill, Königstein plant

=== Foundation ===
Founded in 1852 by Hermann Giesecke (1831–1900) and Alphonse Devrient (1821–1878), the firm initially specialized in high-quality printing, notably currency and securities printing. Two years after its founding, G+D printed its first banknote—a 10-thaler note for the Weimarische Bank. By the time of the Proclamation of the German Empire, more than two-thirds of Germany's private and state banks had become clients of G+D.

From the 1850s to the 1870s, the firm printed some important biblical editions of Constantin von Tischendorf. The partnership's reputation for quality work was confirmed at the 1867 international exhibition in Paris. In 1873, the company began printing banknotes for clients outside Europe, starting with an order from Banco de Piura in Peru, followed by commissions from different countries and empires such as Siam and the Ottoman Empire.

In an attempt to eliminate the national debts, the government of the Weimar Republic had massively expanded the money supply after the end of the war in 1918, which led to hyperinflation in the 1920s. Due to the rampant currency devaluation, the Reich's printing office was no longer able to meet the rapidly growing demand for banknotes. This prompted the Reichsbank to commission private printing companies – including G&D – to print banknotes. It also printed tickets to the 1936 Olympics in Germany and did business with Spain under Franco.

=== Post-war period ===
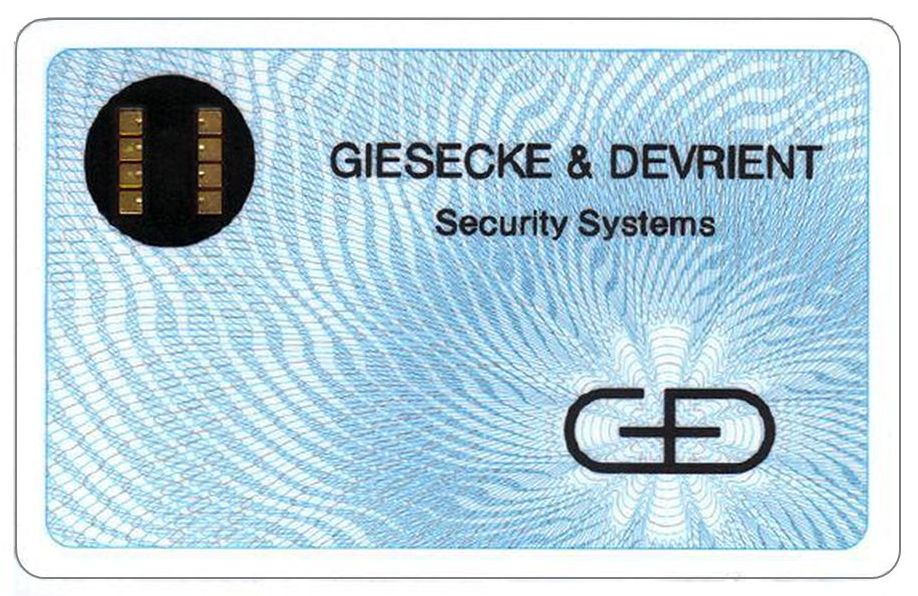
First chip card produced by Giesecke & Devrient, 1979

After World War II, Leipzig ended up becoming part of the communist East Germany, and the company's printing facility was nationalized by the government as VEB Wertpapierdruckerei and began printing banknotes of East German mark. In 1948, the company was re-established in Munich by Siegfried Otto, husband of Jutta Devrient, a descendant of Alphonse Devrient.

In 1958, Siegfried Otto internationalised the company by founding a subsidiary in Mexico. The same year, the company received a commission from Deutsche Bundesbank to print Deutsche Mark banknotes.

In 1970, Siegfried Otto founded the Gesellschaft für Automation und Organisation mbH (GAO), which served as the hub for G+D's research and development activities for more than 30 years. The GAO primarily focused on modernising and automating banknote processing and payment transactions.

=== Expansion ===
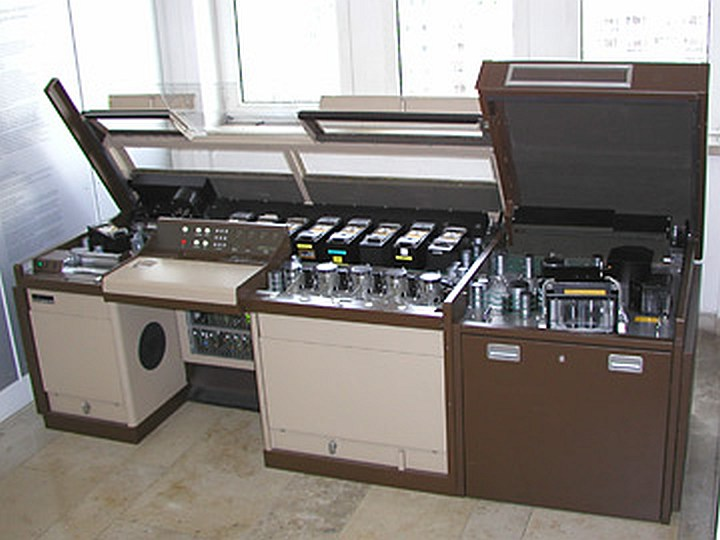
ISS 300PS banknote processing system (1986), on display at the Deutsches Museum since 2006

Since the 1970s, G+D has expanded operations to include banknote processing systems, smart cards, SIM cards, identification systems, security technology, and e-payments. In 1975, G+D delivered the first automated banknote whose authenticity could be verified by machine-readable features.

From 1990 onwards, G+D expanded its offerings in the field of chip cards. This led to several innovations, including the introduction of the first health insurance card in 1993, the first multifunctional Eurocheque card with an electronic wallet function in Austria in 1995, and the world's first SIM-based mobile banking application in 1998. By the mid-1990s, G+D had established itself as a supplier of cards, and terminals for Germany's Geldkarte system. Shortly thereafter, a new business segment, Security Systems, was created for information and network security. Following German reunification, G+D reacquired its original headquarters in Leipzig in 1991, integrating it into the Munich-based group as a site for security printing and banknote production. That same year, the company delivered its first SIM card.

In 1999, Giesecke+Devrient acquired the British American Bank Note Company and renamed it to BA International Inc. G+D has been printing for the European Central Bank (alongside Bundesdruckerei and other security printers) since 1999. In 2002, the company was responsible for the development, design, and printing of a new banknote series for Afghanistan. Over the following years, G+D developed Visa personalisation systems for countries such as Kazakhstan, Serbia, and Italy, as well as producing electronic health cards, including for Taiwan.

In 2004, G+D acquired the IT security service provider Secunet (Secunet Security Networks AG) and initially held 47% of the shares. In 2009, the company increased its stake to 79%.

In 2012, G+D launched its first eSIM on the market; a digital version of the conventional SIM card that is permanently installed in the device and does not require a physical card. These are used in smartphones, watches and cars, among other things. The same year, Giesecke+Devrient closed BA International Inc.

A second printing line was opened in Malaysia in 2013, doubling the capacity of the local banknote printing plant.

=== Suspension of business with Zimbabwe ===
Giesecke+Devrient have a history of doing business with Rhodesia and its successor state Zimbabwe going back to 1965, and they have been supplying security paper for banknotes, passports and other instruments to the government of Zimbabwe throughout the hyperinflation in Zimbabwe.

In June 2008 U.S. officials announced they would not take any action against the firm. It was reported that on 1 July 2008 that Giesecke+Devrient would no longer have a Reserve Bank of Zimbabwe partnership. Dr. Karsten Ottenberg, CEO and Chairman of the G+D Management Board, explained:

"Our decision is a reaction to the political tension in Zimbabwe, which is mounting significantly rather than easing as expected, and takes account of the critical evaluation by the international community, German government and general public."

=== Expansion of business activities and restructuring ===
In January 2015, G+D founded Veridos GmbH in Berlin as a cooperation with Bundesdruckerei, with G+D holding 60%. This company is offering secure identification products for governments, such as ID cards, passports, and automated border control systems. In the same year, G+D closed its banknote printing facility in Munich, increasing printing capacities at its Leipzig site. Additionally, the company relocated its chip card personalisation operations to Neustadt near Coburg.

In 2017, Giesecke+Devrient joined the Verimi identification platform, which together with more than a dozen well-known German and foreign companies, offers a portal for the protection of digital identity and personal data. G+D has held a 10% stake in Verimi since January 2018.

At the same time, the company underwent restructuring and transformed into a holding structure, distributing its business activities across four subsidiaries. In April 2018, the company's name was slightly modified from Giesecke & Devrient (G+D) to Giesecke+Devrient (G+D). The business was divided into the units G+D Currency Technology (including the Louisenthal paper mill), Secunet, Veridos, and G+D Mobile Security. That same year, G+D raised €200 million through a promissory note loan.

In July 2018, G+D secured a contract to produce electronic passports for the residents of Bangladesh. Over a ten-year period, the company will supply 160 million passports as part of a €340 million deal, marking one of G+D's largest projects. The same year, Build38 was created as a spin-off and took over part of the Mobile App Security and Intelligence portfolio. It has its head office in Munich, development in Barcelona and sales office in Singapore. It provides in-app protection systems to manage mobile apps on insecure mobile devices.

In 2019, G+D acquired a 4.85% stake in Berlin-based Brighter AI Technologies to support developments in biometric identity protection, such as facial anonymisation. In the same year, a decision was made to repurpose part of the company headquarters in Munich-Steinhausen. The old building, constructed between 1953 and 1959, was demolished in 2020. A new structure, completed in 2024 and named Der Bogen (the arch), provides space for retail, restaurants, and offices.

In 2020, G+D Ventures acquired stakes in the crypto-asset company Metaco and a 30% share in Swiss software company Netcetera. By January 2024, its stake in Netcetera was increased to 95% to accelerate growth in digital payment systems. Additionally, G+D developed Filia, a central bank digital currency designed as digital cash for offline payments via smartphones or smart cards. Filia does not require a bank account or network connection, ensures no private data is disclosed, and incurs no transaction fees.

=== New developments ===
In 2021, G+D acquired the British Pod Group active in scalable internet of things (IoT) connectivity technologies. It invested into the start-ups FNA and Stashcat for secure communications. That same year, G+D launched its first pilot projects in the field of central bank digital currencies (CBDCs), including collaborations with the Bank of Ghana and the Bank of Thailand. A year later, G+D acquired the payment and identity business units of Valid USA, including three production facilities in Illinois and Indiana, employing over 400 staff in total.

In 2023, G+D acquired the Munich-based company Mecomo AG. This acquisition is aimed at expanding its IoT application divisions. Mecomo, headquartered in Unterschleißheim, employs approximately 60 staff. In the same year, G+D activated its 100 millionth eSIM.

In March 2025, Security Papers Limited (SPL) which is a subsidiary of Pakistan Security Printing Corporation, awarded a paper machine upgrade project worth Rs3.4 billion to a Giesecke+Devrient (G+D).

== Anti-counterfeiting ==
In November 2009 Giesecke+Devrient announced plans to form a new company with SAP AG and Nokia Corp., named Original1, to deliver product authentication and anti-counterfeiting services globally. The headquarters is in Frankfurt, Germany. Original1 offers user authentication, end-to-end encryption of the information flow and database encryption. Original1 On-Demand is an online product for brand product protection.
As of August 2012, Original1 is in liquidation. The supervisory board (40% SAP, 40% Nokia, 20% Giesecke+Devrient) dismissed the 3 managing directors with 6 months notice and 6 months severance. The remaining employees were dismissed with 3 months notice and no severance.

== Company structure ==
Giesecke+Devrient GmbH is the parent company of the G+D Group and is headquartered in Munich. It is led by Ralf Wintergerst. As of 2024, G+D has 123 subsidiaries, ten of which are located in Germany.

The corporate group consists of Secunet, G+D Ventures, Veridos, and Netcetera. G+D is the majority shareholder of Secunet Security Networks, which is based in Essen, holding 75.11% of its shares as of 2021. Since 2018, G+D Ventures has been investing in start-ups in the TrustTech sector, backing technologies that improve trust in digital processes. They provide financial support as well as access to the G+D Group's network. Veridos, based in Berlin, operates in the field of identity technologies, developing physical and digital identification documents as well as identity management and verification applications. Netcetera is an IT service provider active in software applications and digital services, primarily in the banking, mobility, and healthcare sectors.

With its products, the company is among the global market and technology leaders.

The company's archival materials are housed at the Saxon State Archives (State Archive Leipzig) under the collection number 21061.

== Business segments ==
The company offers products and applications for security technology (SecurityTech) in three segments, each of which generated sales of just under one billion euros in 2023.

=== Digital Security ===
The Digital Security segment includes applications in the fields of connectivity and the Internet of Things (IoT), identity technology, and digital infrastructures, safeguarding and managing sensitive systems, networks, data, and identities. This includes technologies such as SIM, eSIM, and iSIM cards, identity documents and management systems, as well as cybersecurity applications for customers including governments, public authorities, healthcare providers, and industries.

G+D's SecurityTech includes applications for identity protection and the safeguarding of sensitive data through verification and authentication technologies. For example, G+D encrypts government documents and develops biometric border control systems for airports. G+D also supplies smartphone manufacturers like Apple and Samsung with eSIMs and the associated management systems.

=== Financial Platforms ===
The Financial Platforms segment includes integrated applications for payments and banking. The offering covers all steps of the financial services process – from registration and authentication to card issuance, digital banking, and checkout in e-commerce. Additionally, G+D supports banks in meeting ESG requirements.

=== Currency Technology ===
The Currency Technology segment includes applications for the entire cash cycle, both physical and digital. This includes counterfeit-resistant banknote designs, highly secure banknote production and processing, as well as digital currency offerings such as central bank digital currencies (CBDC). In addition, G+D supports central banks in developing efficient cash cycle applications and payment technologies for both physical and digital currencies.

== Economic key figures ==
The following key financial figures relate to the consolidated financial statements in accordance with IFRS and Section 317 HGB and were published in the company's annual reports.

Year	Sales revenue EUR M	Gross profit EUR M	Net income EUR M	Employees Abroad	Employees Germany
1999	902	325	40.0	1833	3310
2002	1088	358	23.5	2819	3606
2004	1157	359	38.4	3852	3485
2006	1297	388	81.1	4947	3348
2008	1689	528	111.0	6102	3747
2009	1684	503	104.5	6230	3892
2010	1688	564	80.5	6493	3920
2011	1635	521	52.4	6613	3941
2012	1789	530	39.0	7125	4088
2013	1754	505	2.6	7516	4144
2014	1833	461	73.3	7286	4167
2015	2011	538	54.5	7432	3947
2016	2089	589	52.5	7453	3847
2017	2136	619	67.0	7613	3987
2018	2246	613	50.2	7247	4142
2019	2447	653	80.4	7281	4229
2020	2313	654	42.9	7137	4345
2021	2377	684	85.2	7366	4402
2022	2527	168	80.6	7969	4635
2023	2973	176	92.1	9329	4874
2024	3132	187	88.3	9520	4915

== G+D Foundation ==
In 2010, shareholder Verena von Mitschke-Collande founded the G+D Foundation to support institutions and develop projects focusing on art, culture, and education. The foundation is a supporter of the Museum of Printing (Museum für Druckkunst) in Leipzig, which promotes courses for children and young people and organises informational events to convey knowledge about the cultural history of typesetting, printing, and bookbinding. Since October 2021, the G+D Foundation has managed the Giesecke+Devrient Foundation Banknote Collection, which, with more than 300,000 banknotes, is one of the most significant collections of its kind.

== Sustainability ==
Sustainability measures include the decarbonisation of business operations with the goal of achieving net-zero emissions by 2040, the transition to 98% green electricity, and emission reductions through efficiency improvements, such as the use of 5G networks. Additionally, G+D develops sustainable products such as recyclable payment cards and environmentally friendly e-passports. Recyclable payment cards are produced in collaboration with Deutsche Bank and Mastercard. In 2023, Deutsche Bank announced plans to switch around 19 million bank cards to recycled materials by the end of 2024. This switch will result in a CO_{2} reduction of approximately 65% compared to traditional methods.

In 2022, G+D launched the Green Banknote Initiative. The goal of the initiative is to make the production and lifecycle of banknotes more sustainable, thereby reducing the environmental impact of banknote production.

== Awards (selection) ==
- 2015: Via Oeconomica business award for Giesecke+Devrient Wertpapierdruckerei Leipzig GmbH
- 2020: Best New Environmental Sustainability Project for the Louisenthal subsidiary
- 2022: Best Technology Award in the Global Fast Track CBDC competition for the Filia application, presented by the Hong Kong Monetary Authority (HKMA) and InvestHK
- 2023: Mittelstandspreis der Medien (Media award for medium-sized companies) for Giesecke+Devrient GmbH

== Literature ==
- Faulmann, Karl (1882). Illustrirte Geschichte der Buchdruckerkunst: mit besonderer Berücksichtigung ihrer technischen Entwicklung bis zur Gegenwart [Illustrated history of the art of printing: with special reference to its technical development up to the present day]. Vienna: A. Hartleben. OCLC 2847445.
- Bender, Klaus W. (2006). Moneymakers: the Secret World of Banknote Printing. Weinheim: Wiley-VCH Verlag. ISBN 978-3-527-50236-3; OCLC 69326754
- Prell, Jan Hendrik; Böttge, Horst (2002). Giesecke & Devrient 1852–2002. Werte im Wandel der Zeit [Values through the ages]. Stuttgart: Deutscher Sparkassen-Verlag. ISBN 3-09-303892-8.
- Jungmann-Stadler, Franziska; Devrient, Ludwig (2009). Giesecke & Devrient. Banknotendruck 1854–1943 / Banknote Printing 1854–1943. Munich: Battenberg Gietl Verlag. ISBN 978-3-86646-527-5.
- Giesecke & Devrient (2012). Ein Jahrzehnt der Innovation. Giesecke & Devrient 2002–2011 / A Decade of Innovation. Giesecke & Devrient 2002–2011. Munich: Battenberg Gietl Verlag. ISBN 978-3-86646-549-7
- Jungmann-Stadler, Franziska; Devrient, Ludwig (2014). Giesecke & Devrient. Banknotendruck 1955–2002 / Banknote Printing 1955–2002. Cologne: Böhlau Verlag. ISBN 978-3-412-22258-1.
- Horst Böttge, Horst; Mahl, Tobias; Kamp, Michael (2013). Von der ec-Karte zu Mobile Security 1968–2012 / From Eurocheque Card to Mobile Security 1968–2012. Munich: Battenberg Gietl Verlag. ISBN 978-3-86646-549-7.
- Tobias Mahl, Astrid Wolff (2014). Louisenthal 1964–2014. Ostfildern: Jan Thorbecke Verlag. ISBN 978-3-7995-0590-1.
- Giesecke+Devrient (2022). Ein Jahrzehnt der Transformation. Giesecke+Devrient 2012–2022 / A Decade of Transformation. Giesecke+Devrient 2012–2022. Munich. ISBN 978-3-00-072804-4.

== See also ==
- Jiaozhou dollar, printed by G&D
- Hyperinflation in Zimbabwe
