= Cummins Allison =

American currency handling company

Cummins Allison Corp.
- Industry: Currency and coin solutions
- Headquarters: Mount Prospect, Illinois, U.S.
- Key people: Douglas Mennie (former President)
- Website: cumminsallison.com

Cummins Allison Corp. is a company which creates currency handling and coin handling systems, including currency and coin counting machines. Its products are primarily used by banks and casinos for counting and sorting money. Cummins Allison was created in 1887 in Mount Prospect, Illinois. It is the only U.S. owned and operated manufacturer of coin and currency handling, but also has offices in North America and the UK. In June 2012, Cummins Allison was rated the third most innovative company in Chicago based on number and quality of patents.
At December 31, 2019 the company had been acquired by Crane Payment Innovations (CPI).

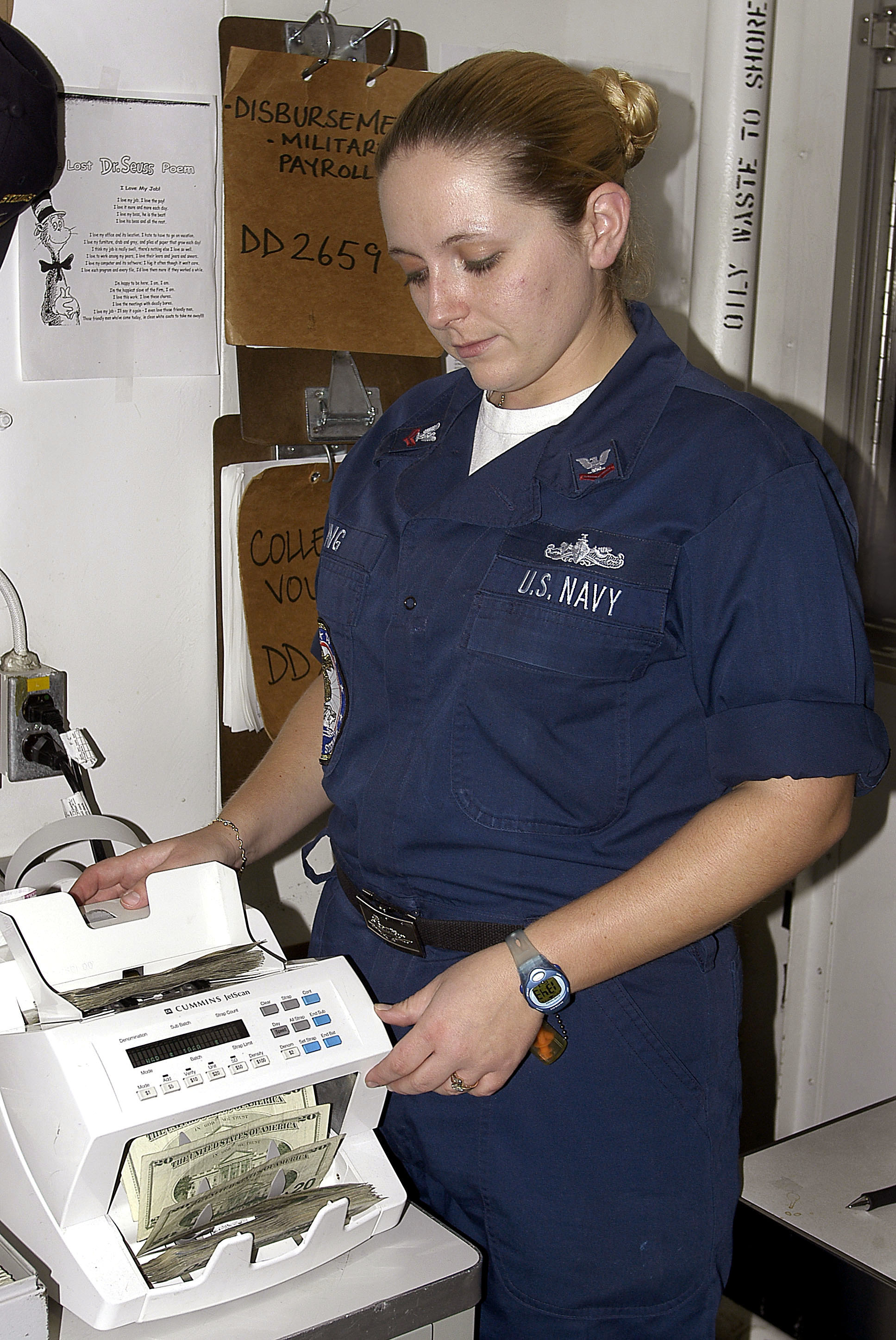
A U.S. Navy Disbursing Clerk using a Cummins Allison JetScan to count United States twenty-dollar bills.
