= Jacob's ladder surface =

Infinite mathematical manifold

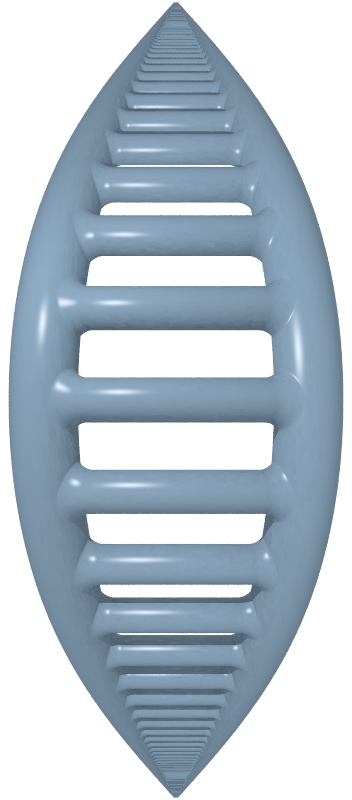

In mathematics, Jacob's ladder is a surface with infinite genus and two ends. It was named after Jacob's ladder by Étienne Ghys, because the surface can be constructed as the boundary of a ladder that is infinitely long in both directions.

== See also ==
- Cantor tree surface
- Loch Ness monster surface
