= Cantor tree surface =

Fractal with infinite genus

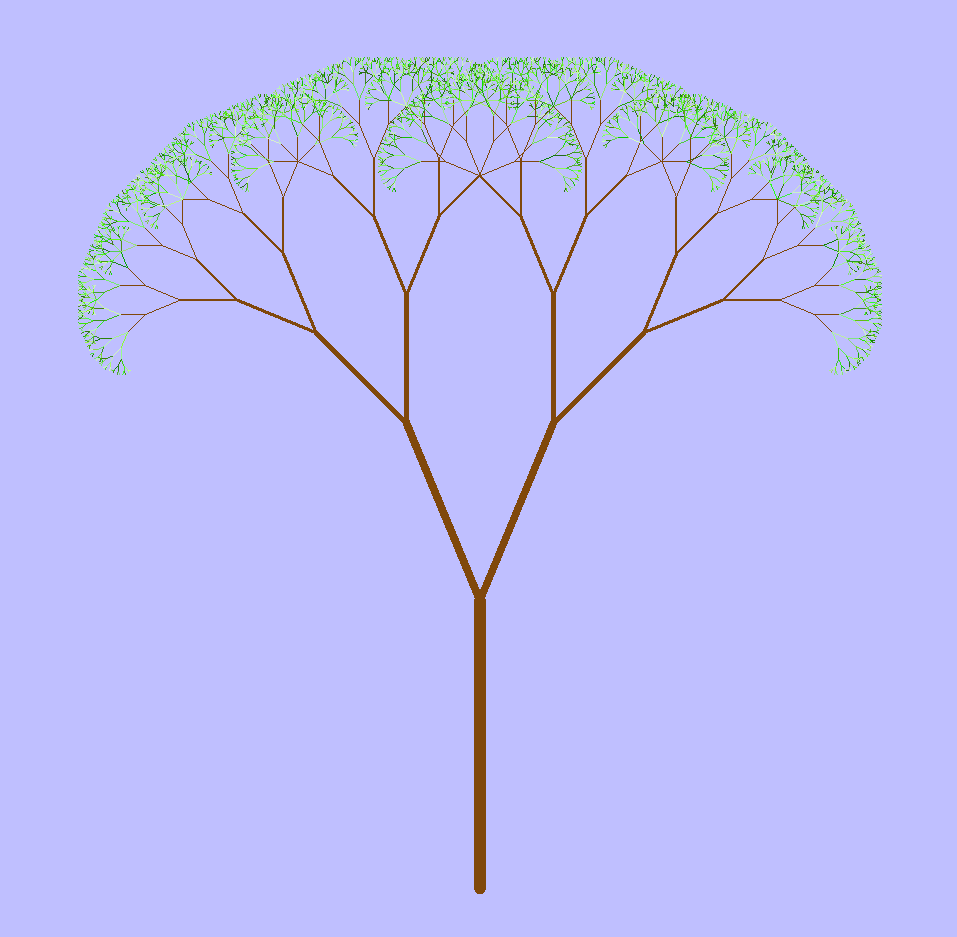
The bark of a fractal tree, splitting in two directions at each branch point, forms a Cantor tree surface. Drilling a hole through the tree at each branch point would produce a blooming Cantor tree.

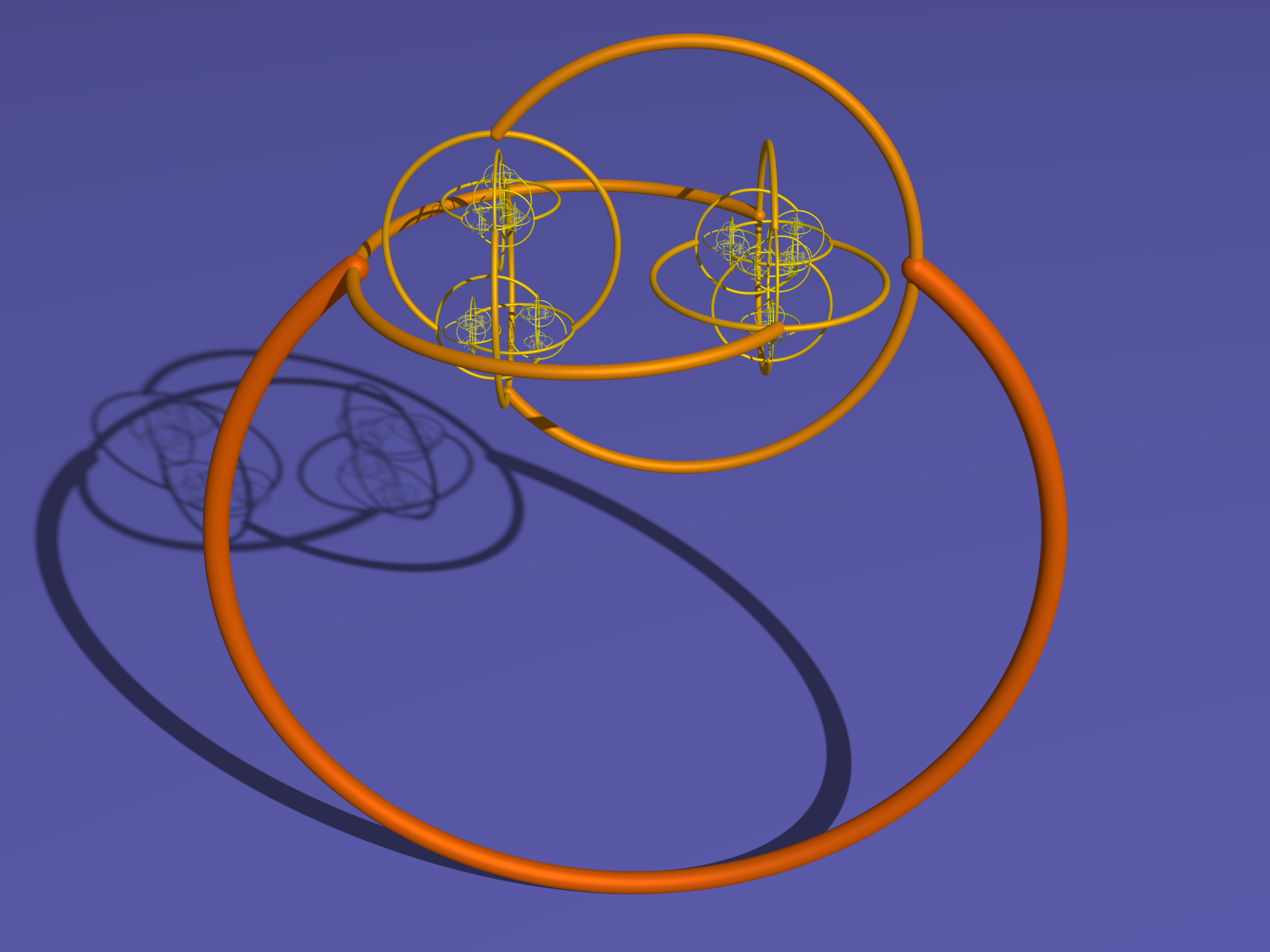
An Alexander horned sphere. Its non-singular points form a Cantor tree surface.

In dynamical systems, the Cantor tree is an infinite-genus surface homeomorphic to a sphere with a Cantor set removed. The blooming Cantor tree is a Cantor tree with an infinite number of handles added in such a way that every end is a limit of handles.

== See also ==
- Jacob's ladder surface
- Loch Ness monster surface
