= East Rutherford Operations Center =

Regional office of the Federal Reserve Bank of New York

Coordinates: 40°49′39″N 74°05′45″W

The East Rutherford Operations Center (EROC) at 100 Orchard Street, East Rutherford, New Jersey, is the regional office for cash handling and banknote processing of the Federal Reserve Bank of New York. The facility, which was constructed by Torcon in the early 1990s, features a 400,000-square-foot (37,000 m^{2}) three-story structure which sits on 13 acres (5.3 ha). The structure is designed to house fail-safe operations in a secure environment. The facility also has a state-of-the art automated vault measuring one million cubic feet, used for storing United States currency. The vault is based on an automated storage and retrieval system (AS/RS) and can hold at least USD 60 billion. Internally, the cash is transferred by automated guided vehicles (AGV).

The center is one of three Federal Reserve Automation Services (FRAS) facilities in the Federal Reserve Banks system. They provide support for mission-critical payment systems. They are the survivors of the FedNet 5-year initiative started in 1990 to reengineer the Federal Reserve's fund transfer system, and consolidate twelve data centers into 3.

If operations at East Rutherford fail, then the Federal Reserve Bank of Richmond serve as backup, with the Federal Reserve Bank of Dallas as secondary backup.

In 2000, the facility processed 1.39 billion checks, and USD$320 billion. The center's bank check processing unit was shut down in 2006 as part of the Federal Reserve’s check restructuring process due to more checks being processed digitally. Check processing operations were moved to the Federal Reserve Bank of Philadelphia.

== FedWire ==
The Fedwire is real-time gross settlement (RTGS) system that operates from 8:30 a.m. Eastern Time (ET) to 6:30 p.m. and allows its subscribing 11,000 institutions to transfer funds. The Fedwire service is operated by the Federal Reserve Information Technology (FRIT) facility at EROC. Fedwire also houses the primary (XRF) backup facility with the secondary backup facility in Cleveland.

== See also ==
- Banknote processing
- Clearing House Interbank Payments System (CHIPS)
- Society for Worldwide Interbank Financial Telecommunication (SWIFT)
