= Loch Ness monster surface =

Infinite manifold

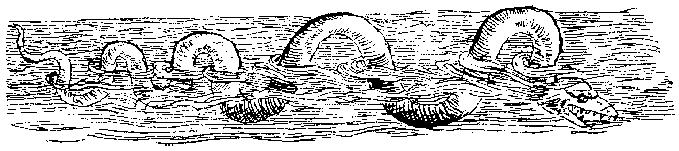
An approximation to the Loch Ness monster surface. The monster should really be infinitely long with an infinite number of loops.

A plot of a part of a Loch Ness monster surface.

In mathematics, the Loch Ness monster is a surface with infinite genus but only one end. It appeared named this way already in a 1981 article by Sullivan & Phillips (1981). The surface can be constructed by starting with a plane (which can be thought of as the surface of Loch Ness) and adding an infinite number of handles (which can be thought of as loops of the Loch Ness monster).

== See also ==
- Cantor tree surface
- Jacob's ladder surface
