= Crumpling =

Deformation of sheet into complex 3D structure

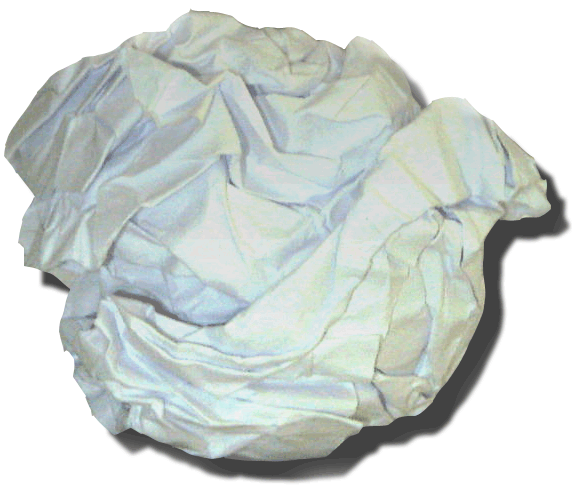
Ball of crumpled paper

In geometry and topology, crumpling is the process whereby a sheet of paper or other two-dimensional manifold undergoes disordered deformation to yield a three-dimensional structure comprising a random network of ridges and facets with variable density. The geometry of crumpled structures is of interest to mathematicians studying topology. Crumpled paper balls have been studied and found to exhibit surprisingly complex structures with compressive strength resulting from frictional interactions at locally flat facets between folds. The unusually high compressive strength of crumpled structures relative to their density is of interest in the disciplines of materials science and mechanical engineering.

== Significance ==
The packing of a sheet by crumpling is a complex phenomenon that depends on material parameters and the packing protocol. Thus the crumpling behaviour of foil, paper and poly-membranes differs significantly and can be interpreted on the basis of material foldability. The high compressive strength exhibited by dense crumple formed cellulose paper is of interest towards impact dissipation applications and has been proposed as an approach to utilising waste paper.

From a practical standpoint, crumpled balls of paper are commonly used as toys for domestic cats.
