= Ukrainian one hundred-hryvnia note =

Ukrainian banknote

one hundred Ukrainian hryvnias
(Ukraine)
- Value: 100 Ukrainian hryvnia
- Width: 142 mm
- Height: 75 mm
- Security features: Watermarks, SPARK element, security thread, latent images, tactile marks, see-through register, microprinting, variable font size serial number, copy-evident pattern, UV printing, infrared printing
- Material used: Cotton paper
- Years of printing: 1992–present

Obverse
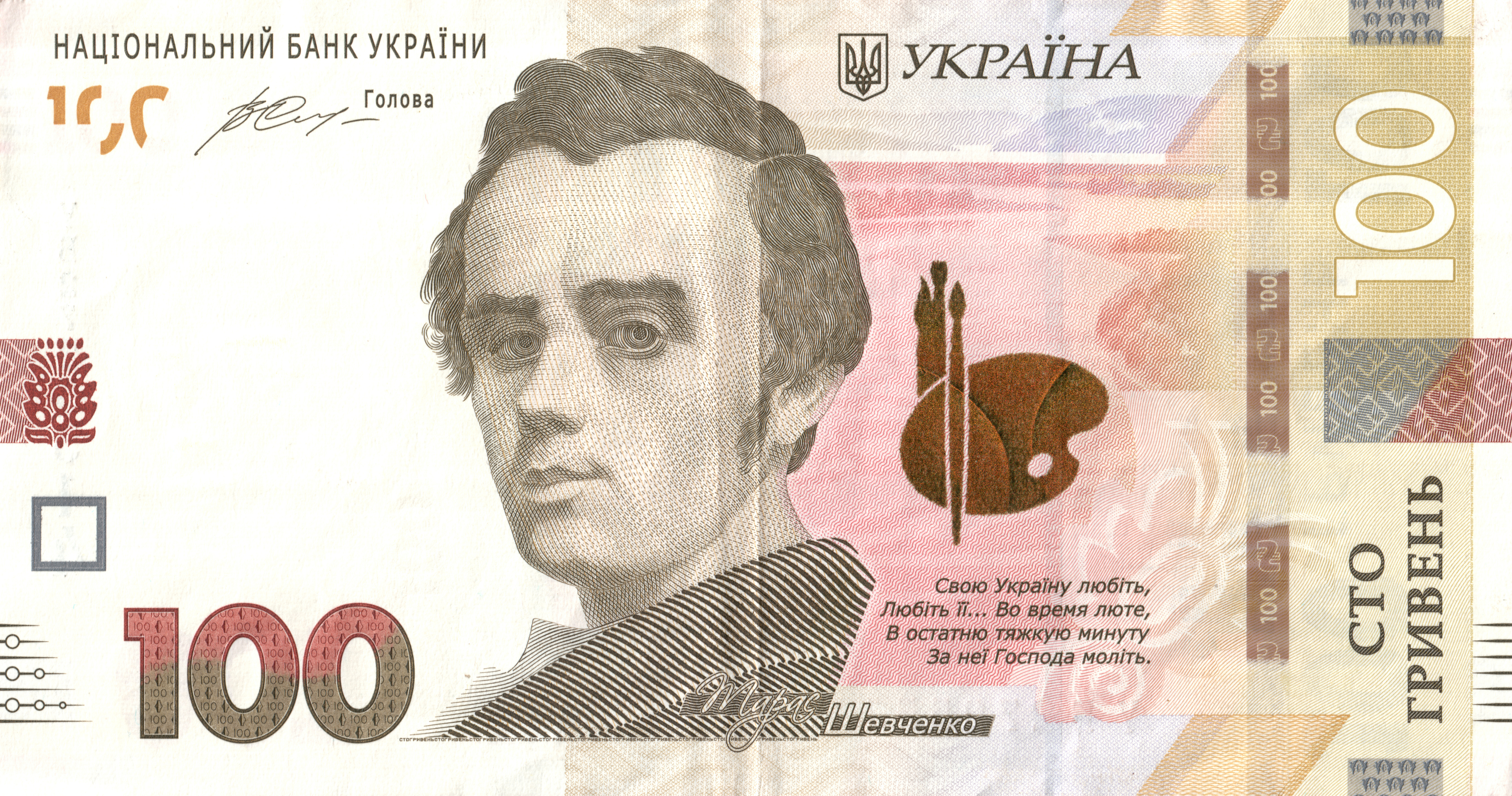
- Design: Taras Shevchenko
- Design date: 2014

Reverse
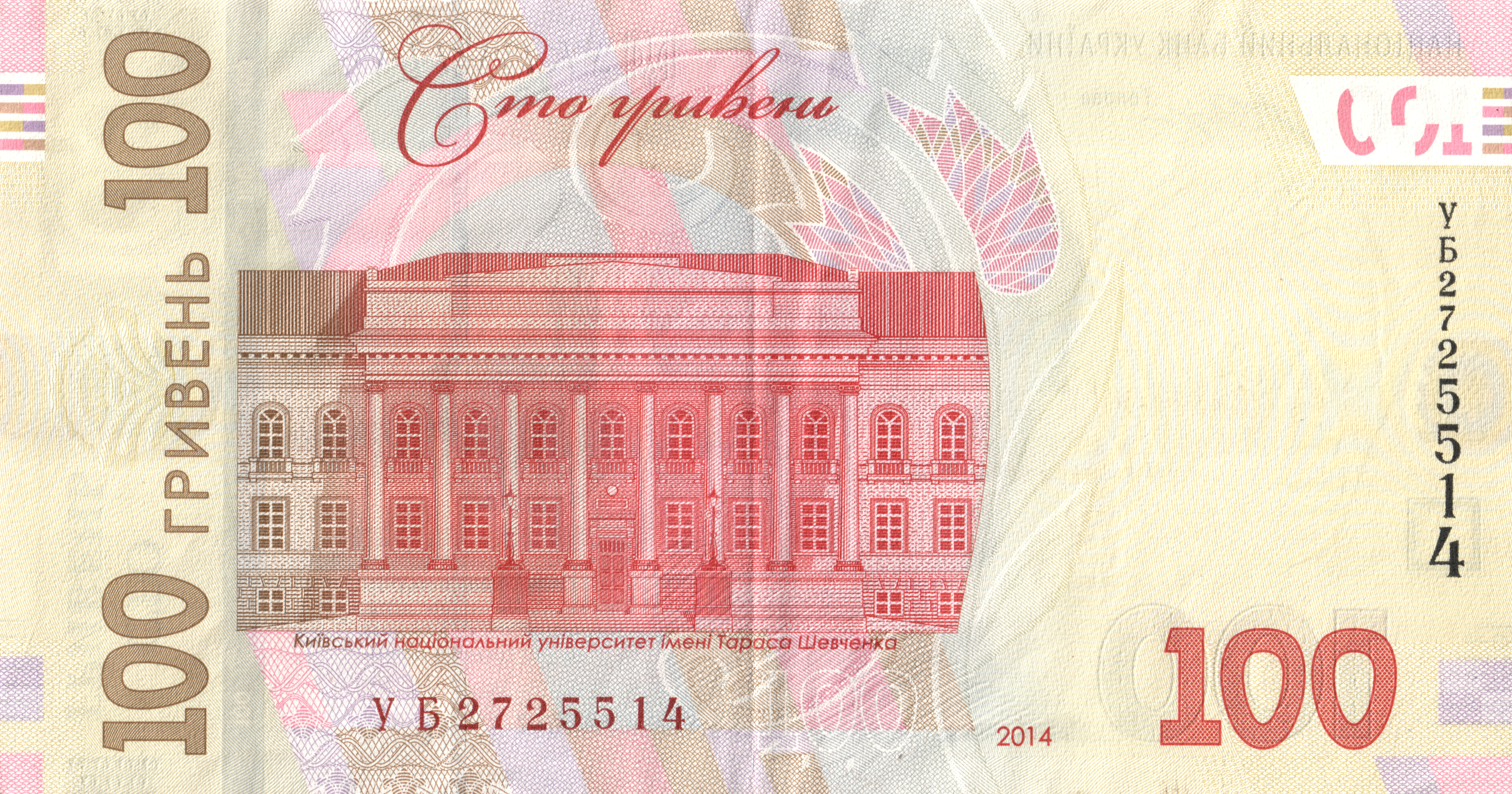
- Design: Kyiv National University
- Design date: 2014

The Ukraine one hundred-hryvnia bill (₴100) is one of the most common banknotes of the Ukrainian hryvnia; it is the main banknote dispensed from Ukrainian automatic banking machines (ABMs).

The second series of Ukrainian hryvnia banknotes included Ivan Kramskoi's portrait of Taras Shevchenko on the face, and the Saint Sophia Cathedral, Kyiv on the reverse. The notes were printed by Thomas de la Rue in 1996 and the National Bank of Ukraine in 2000. The design was also printed by the Canadian Bank Note Company in 1992, but these notes were never issued into circulation.

The olive-coloured version which replaced the second series note was released to the general public on 20 February 2006, with Taras Shevchenko's self-portrait on the face and the Chernecha Hill in Cherkasy and the figures of a blind kobzar with his guide boy on the reverse. In 2014, the reverse image was changed to the façade of the Taras Shevchenko National University of Kyiv, with the new designs entering circulation from 9 March 2015.

== History ==
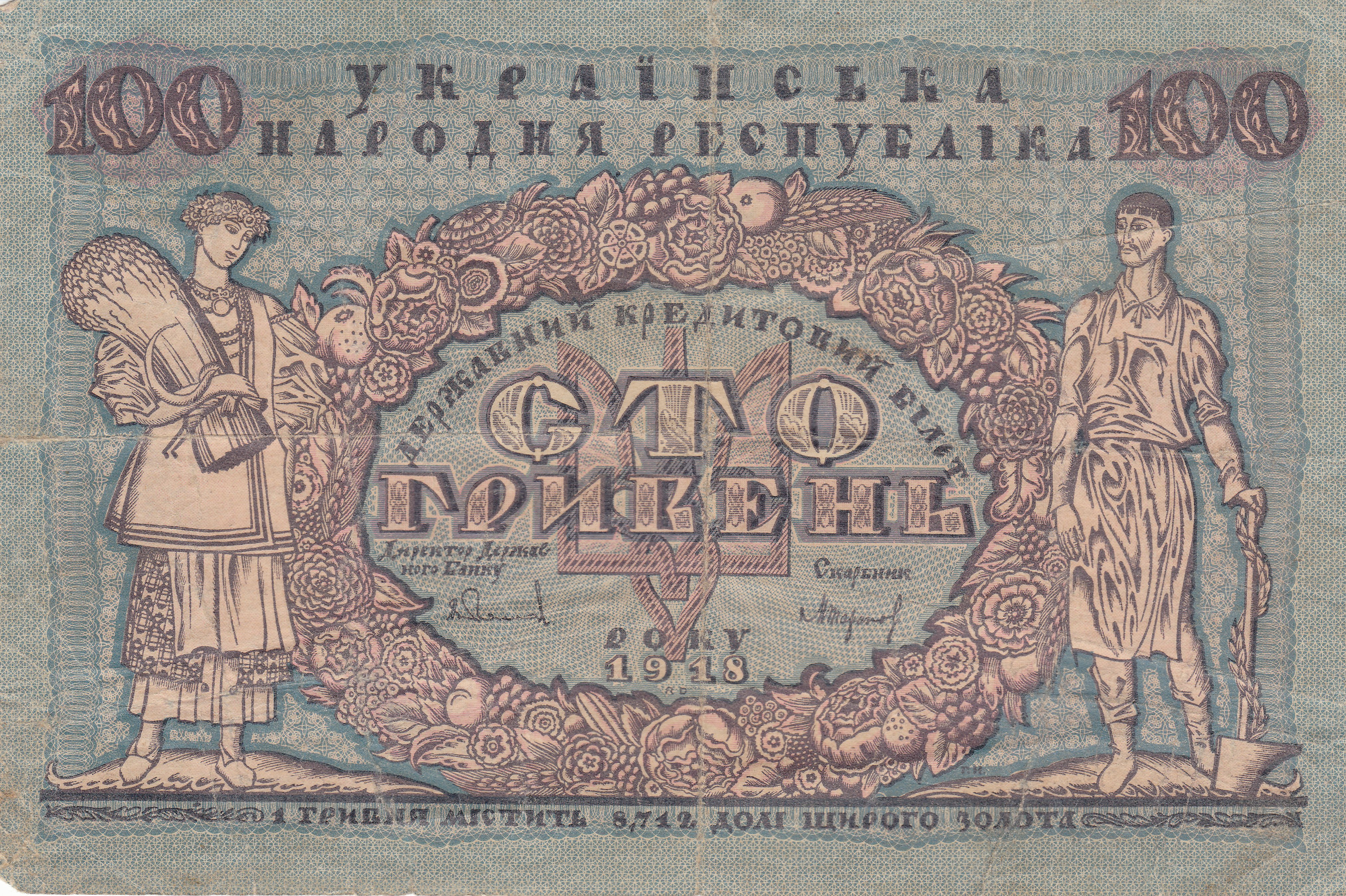
Note of the People's Republic of Ukraine (1918) front side.

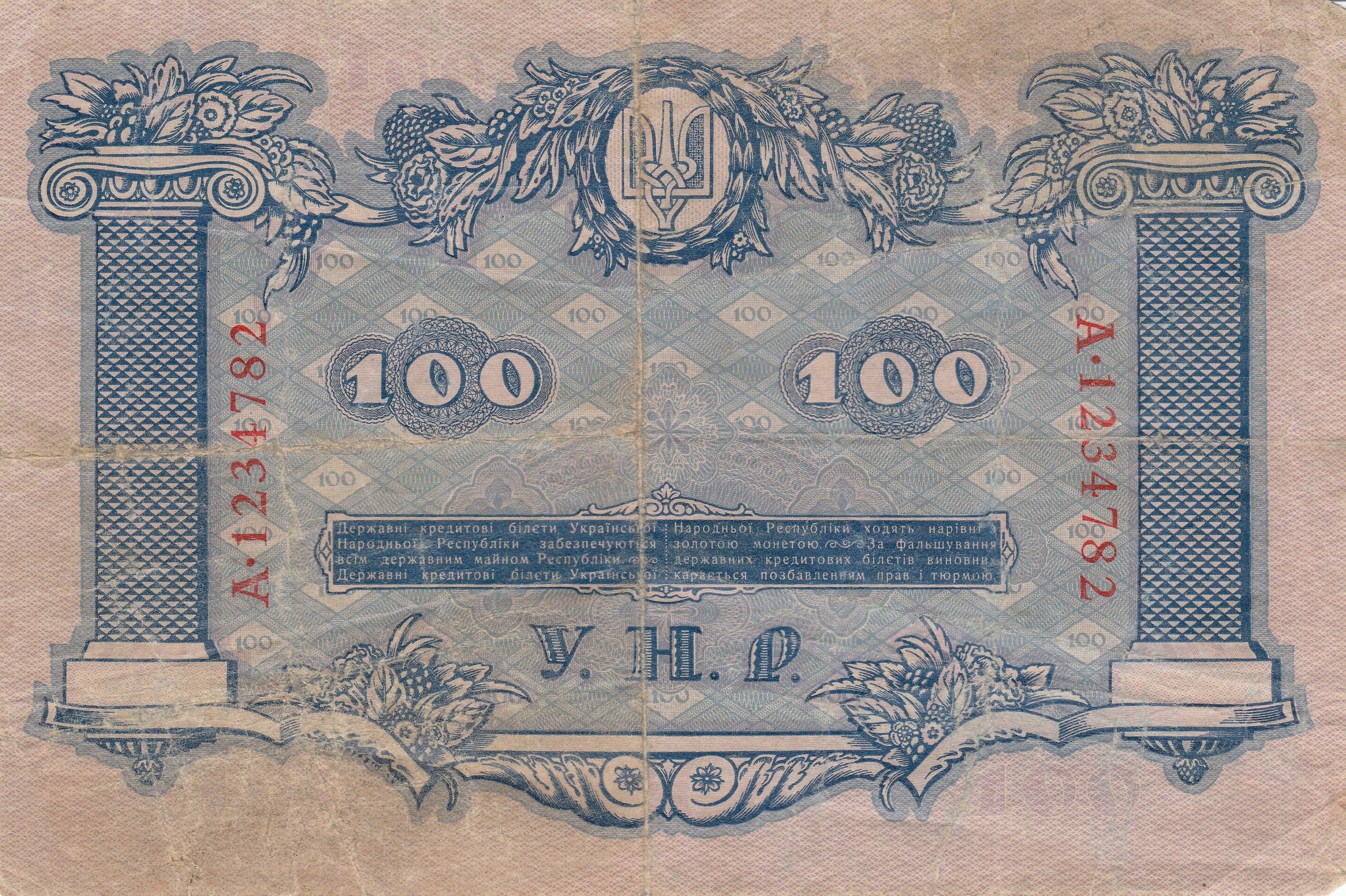
Note of the People's Republic of Ukraine (1918) back side.

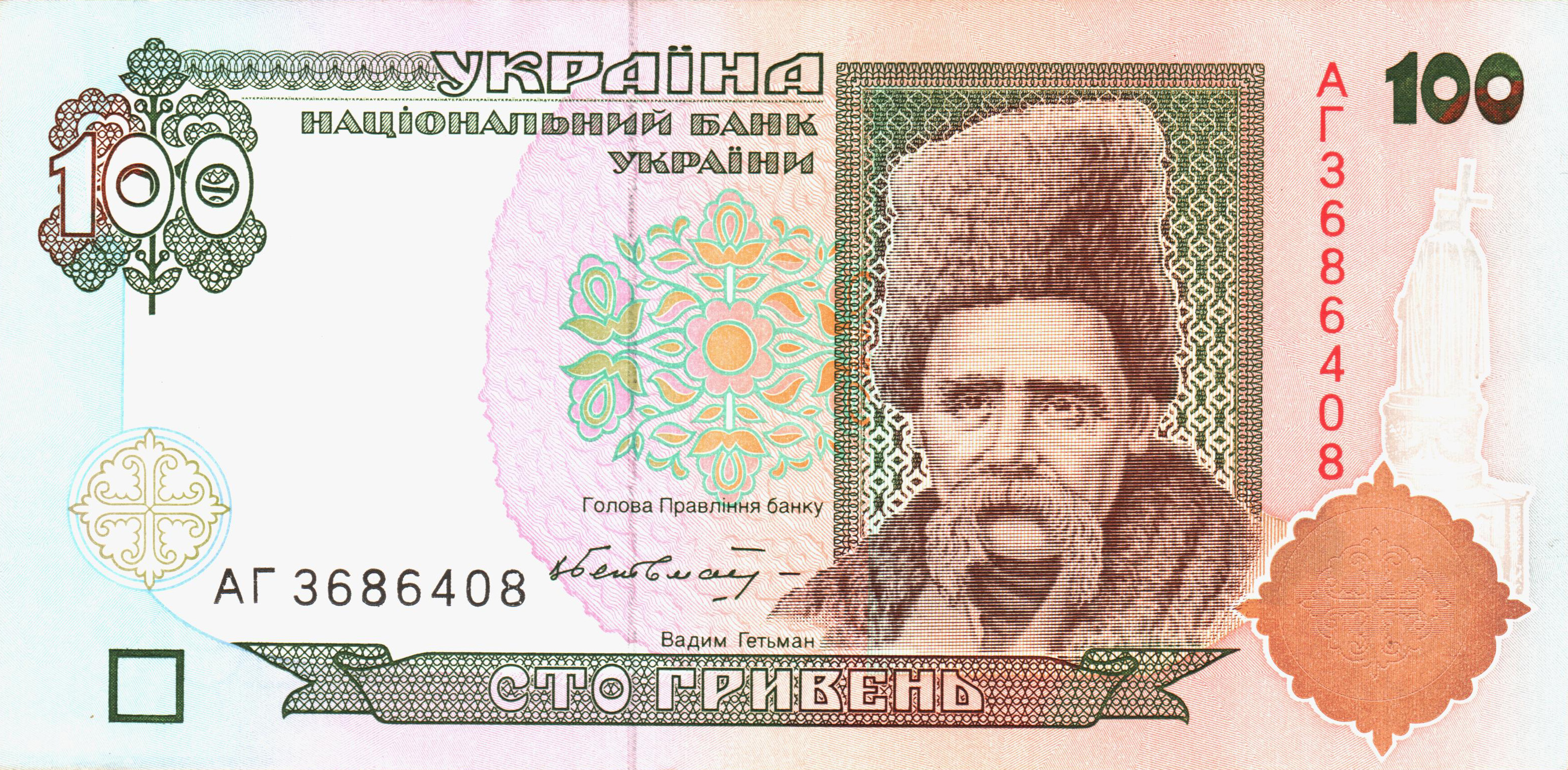
1995 series note front side.

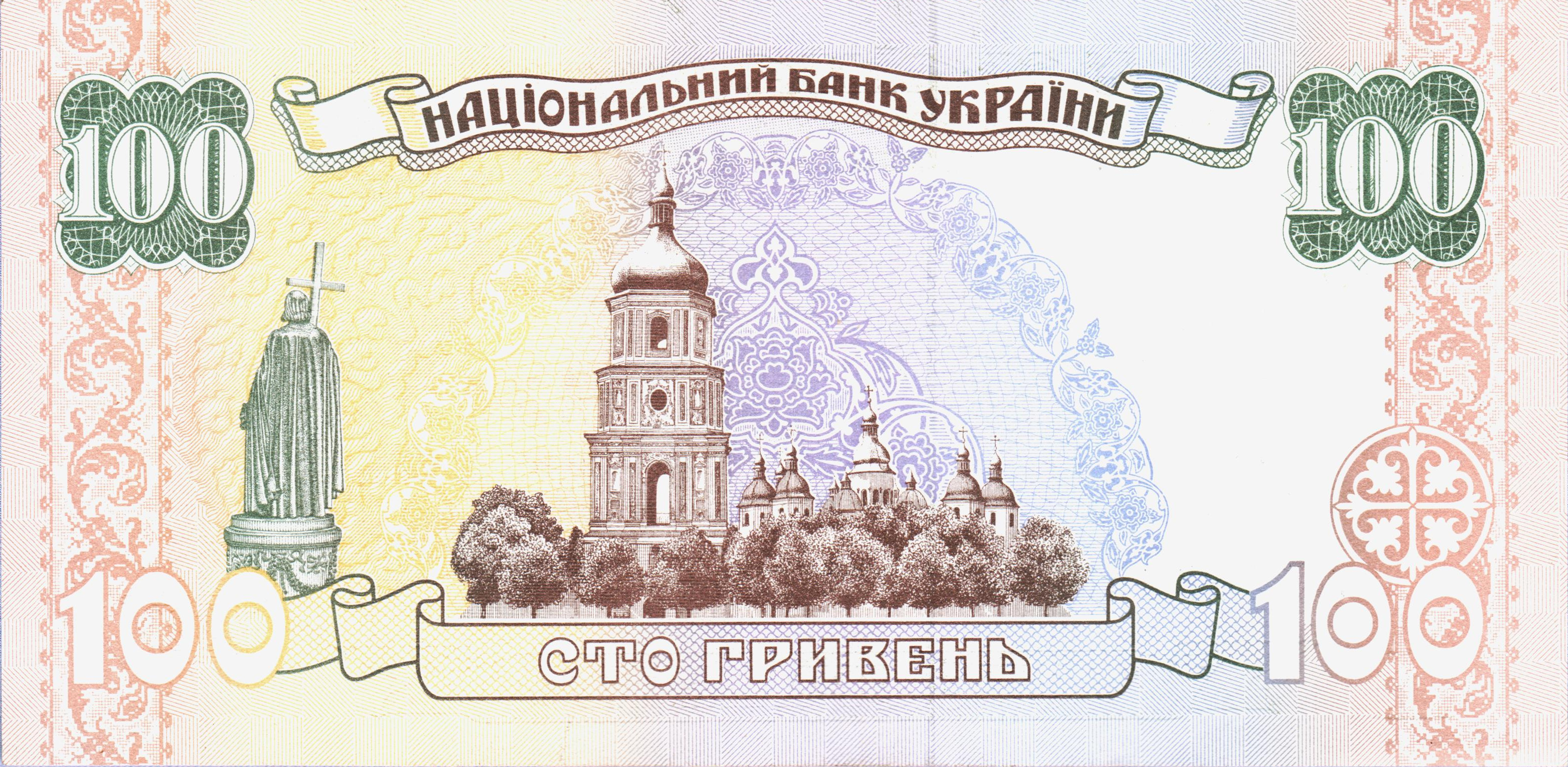
1995 series note back side.

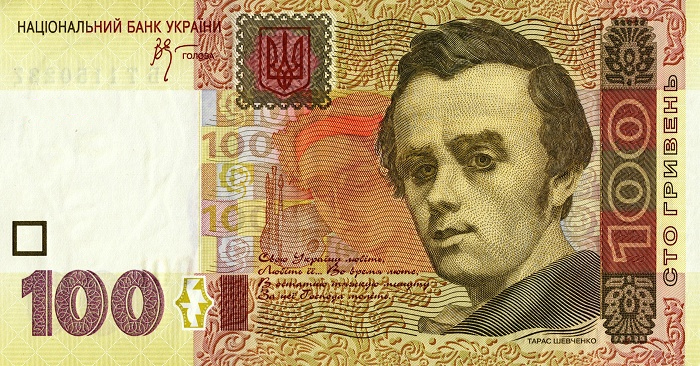
2006 series note front side.

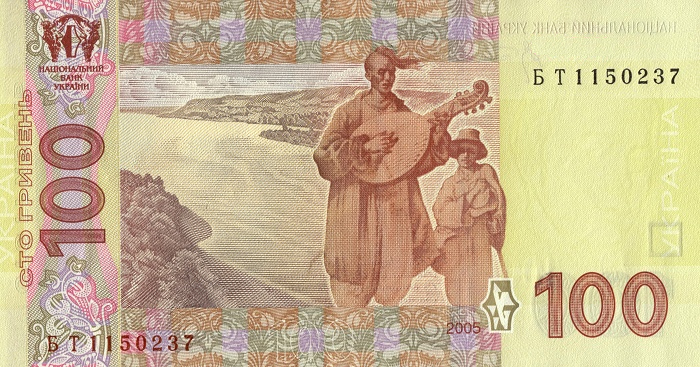
2006 series note back side.
