= Security paper =

Paper with security features

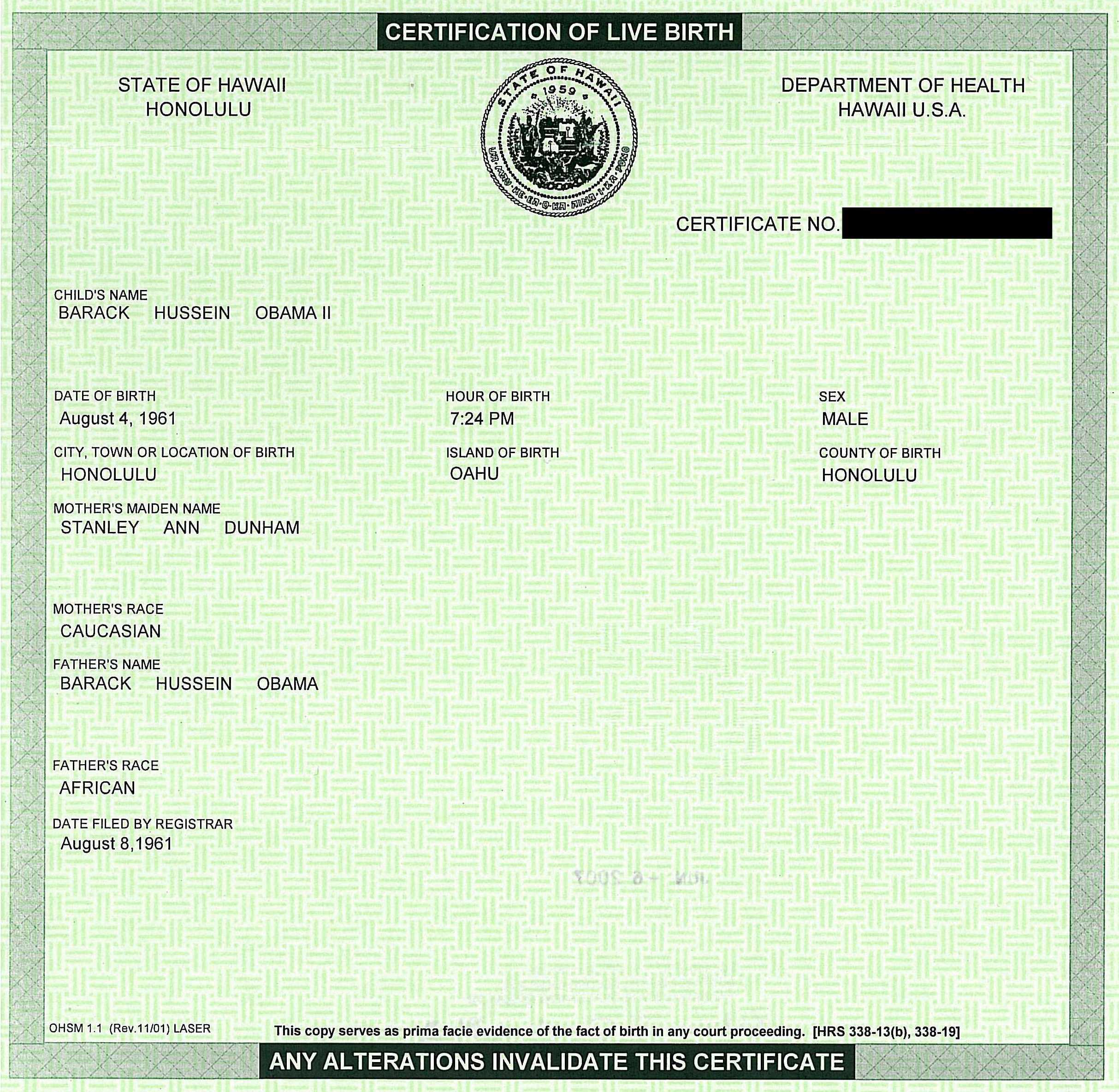
Barack Obama's birth certificate on security paper.

Security paper is a paper used in security printing that incorporates features that can be used to identify or authenticate a document as original, e.g., watermarks or invisible fibres in paper, or features that demonstrate tamper evidence when fraud is attempted, e.g., to remove or alter print such as amounts or signatures on a cheque. Examples of this kind of papers are used for banknotes and used for identification such as passports and certificates, such as birth certificates and different types of academic and qualification certificates, as well as government documents, e.g., voting ballots and tax strips. This also extends to personal and business checks, stock certificates, certificates issued by financial institutions and sensitive government-issued documents. The main use of security paper is to stop people from counterfeiting.

== History ==
An initial patent for the manufacturing process for security paper was granted to Robert E. Menzies and John E. Aitken in the early 20th century. According to the patent, the method by which security paper was produced involved using a soluble thiocyanate (such as ammonium thiocyanate) and lead, which could be used to create an insoluble salt such as lead thiocyanate. This compound would then bind to the paper pulp, adding weight and diminishing visibility of the inner contents of the envelope.

In the United States, under the Intelligence Reform and Terrorism Prevention Act of 2004, Public Law 108-458, December 17, 2004, § 7211(b)(3)(A), 118 Stat. 3826, reprinted in the Official Notes to 5 USC § 301, all states are required to issue their birth certificates on "safety paper" which is "designed to prevent tampering, counterfeiting, or otherwise duplicating the birth certificate for fraudulent purposes."

== Techniques ==
Various techniques exist to implement security paper, particularly for reducing copying. These include:

- Single or multi-tone watermarks – thus the same paper stock must be used in copies.
- A colored or patterned background, so erasures or alterations are visible.
- Protection of classified and sensitive documents: Soft magnetic microwire pieces embedded within security paper can be detected by electromagnetic article surveillance (EM EAS) systems or high-sensitivity metal detectors. This technology is used to prevent unauthorized removal of documents such as trade secrets, blueprints, and government files. Specialized printers can also be configured to print only on certified security paper, providing an additional layer of protection.
- The use of a void pantograph that displays in a photocopied document.
- Dithered patterns, notably a finely dithered background “COPY ALERT” message, which on original is largely indistinguishable from the rest of the background (due to having same overall density), but when copied becomes visible, due to either the scanner or the printer not being able to reproduce the required resolution— effectively a high frequency signal that is smeared out by copying.
- Thermochromatic ink that fades when rubbed.
- Microprinting
- Phosphorescent fibres in the paper that can only be seen in UV-light, or fibres visible in daylight.
- Metallised threads.
- Usage of a pattern in the paper which only appears upon prolonged exposure to UV-light or oxygen (e.g., to indicate expiry).
- Holographic images
- Scratchable surface, e.g., on lottery scratchcards, gift cards, or phone cards to indicate when information has been revealed.
- Chemical sensitisation of the paper, e.g., ink erasers or sensitivity to acids/alkalines.
- Taggants added in the coating or in the base paper; chemical "DNA" that can only be decoded by special means and acts as a unique identifier.
- A note on the paper describing the security measures, so they can be checked.

Generally, the most sophisticated techniques are used with paper money.

== See also ==
- Holography
- Metallizing
- Phosphorescent
- Banknote processing
