= Copy-evident document =

Type of document with features that distinguish copies from an original

Copy-evident documents have features that make it detectable that a copy is not the original.

In security printing, various methods such as void pantograph are used to create patterns that are hard to copy exactly and when copied inexactly produces an easily detectable image. This can include halftone screens that are affected by the copying process, fine line patterns in different directions that are differently affected by copying and hence produce a mark, metallic inks causing diffraction or reflection.

Copy-evident computer image files are also possible, for example by embedding a high-frequency pattern in a JPEG image that is imperceptible, but produces an obvious message when re-compressed with a different quality factor.

Some forms of steganography, paper watermarking, and digital watermarking can be regarded as copy-evidence, although detecting that a document or file has been copied typically requires special inspection, tools or software. For example, 3D printed objects can be equipped with marks of genuinity that can be identified using a measurement device but are hard to deduce from sample objects; copies will lack these marks. As another example, a copy detection pattern.
