= Brand protection =

Prevent third parties from using intellectual property

Brand protection is the process and set of actions that a right holder undertakes to prevent third parties from using its intellectual property without permission or impersonating the brand for fraudulent purposes. These actions address activities that cause loss of revenue and, usually more importantly, destroys brand equity, reputation and trust. Brand protection seeks primarily to ensure that trademarks, patents, and copyrights are respected, though other intellectual property rights such as industrial design rights or trade dress can be involved. While centered on trademarks and patents, modern brand protection also defends against digital deception, such as brand impersonation and phishing attacks. Counterfeiting is the umbrella term to designate infringements to intellectual property, with the exception of the term piracy which is sometimes (colloquially) used to refer to copyright infringement.

A more narrow definition of brand protection which focuses on trademark infringement, is sometimes used. Counterfeiting of physical goods that involves trademark infringement is indeed one of the predominant forms of intellectual property infringement. However, both copyright and patent infringement are possible without an associated trademark infringement, and both may result in loss of revenue and of brand equity. Eliminating diversion, gray market, or product theft and resale, are generally considered as well as part of a brand protection strategy, even though an intellectual property may not be necessarily infringed.

== Organisational measures ==
Registration and management of intellectual property is considered a pre-requisite to launching a brand protection strategy. Effective brand protection measures generally involve implementing prevention processes, monitoring processes, and reaction processes. Internally, the anti-counterfeiting unit will report to top management, develop the brand protection processes, and collaborate closely with the relevant functions for each region and business unit. It will organise training and promote a culture of managing sensitive information carefully with external stakeholders, internally and externally.

For large organisations, an effective brand protection strategy requires collaboration and cooperation between departments, functions, and geographies, as well as with external stakeholders such as customs, law enforcement agencies, governments, industry partners including competitors, retailers and online marketplaces, and suppliers. It requires training of personnel and the development of a company culture of managing sensitive information carefully, both internally and externally. It can however be difficult to secure sufficient budget and resources as losses due to intellectual property infringement are difficult to quantify. Methods exist to quantify the return on investment of elements of a brand protection strategy such as the use of product authentication systems, yet organisations must first acknowledge the existence and significance of the problem.

A cross-industry benchmark was made with the person in charge of anti-counterfeiting of 45 companies with global market presence. The two organisational measures that were judged as most effective are those that help with the integrity of the supply chain and those that contribute to securing distribution channels.

== Technical measures ==
=== Counterfeit detection ===
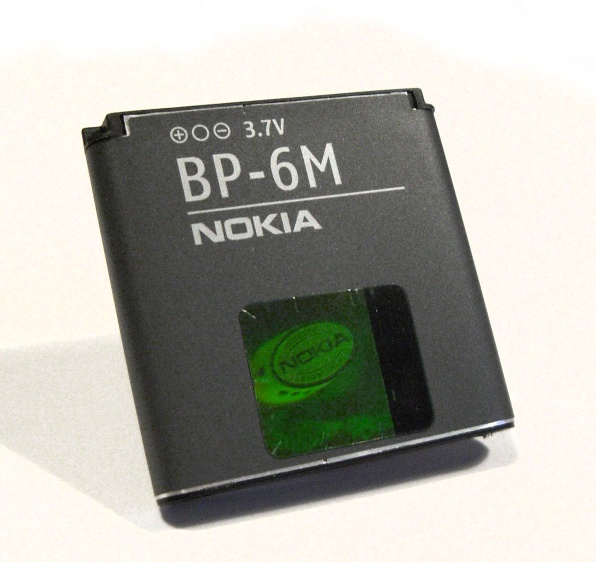
Overt authentication with a security hologram

According to the EUIPO, counterfeiting detection technologies may be classified into five main categories: electronic, marking, chemical and physical, mechanical and technologies for digital media.

ISO standard 12931 provides guidelines and performance criteria to help brand owners define the particular authentication elements for either the packaging or material good itself, based on a counterfeiting risk analysis. Overt security feature, such as a security hologram or optically variable ink, can be verified by an untrained user with human senses (typically by eyesight). Covert security features are verified with an off-the-shelf or purpose-built authentication tool. Both covert and overt security features may also go through the use of specialised equipment by a skilled expert. Overt security features have been criticised for their ineffectiveness, but others argue that they can be "extremely difficult to replicate".

Covert security features used to be verifiable by very few people, and consumers were unaware of their presence. However, according to the ISO standard 12931, a smartphone is technically equivalent to an off-the-shelf covert authentication tool, yet it is a mass-market device which opens authentication on a large scale. Furthermore, it can support overt security authentication by providing the instructions, after a QR code scan, to visually verify an overt authentication element.

A common approach is to combine multiple security elements (including both overt and covert features) as a layered defence against counterfeiting.

According to the ISO standard 12931, track and trace solutions alone, e.g. a serialised 2D barcode placed on each product, is not authentication. QR codes have indeed no protection against exact copy, unless additional techniques are used in combination. Furthermore, QR codes can be vulnerable to being spoofed, where the counterfeiter uses a new QR code to redirect the consumer to a fake authentication response page. There are ways to address this fraud, for example by encouraging users to authenticate through visiting a trusted channel such as the brand owner's website or social media account. A number of techniques exist, such as digital watermarks and secure graphics which are added into QR codes to make them robust against copy, and an app can be used to authenticate. There is also ongoing research on the authentication of blank paper and printed material by extracting the surface fingerprint through a smartphone scan.

=== Consumer engagement and distribution channels monitoring ===
Distributed channels can be monitored, and illicit activity detected, from the analysis of the data generated from the QR Code scans. Consumers can be incentivised to scan QR codes or NFC tags on products, not necessarily for the primary purpose of verifying authenticity, but to obtain relevant information about the product or to engage in a loyalty program. The large quantity of data collected from the scans allows to monitor distribution channels without the need for hiring investigators, and on a much larger scale. Consumers may actually demand the ability to verify that the product is authentic, and this creates an opportunity to engage with the brand.

=== Online monitoring ===
With the growth of e-commerce, brand protection activities need to increasingly take place online. Online brand protection software monitor the Internet and help identify the websites that are likely to sell counterfeit, propose grey market goods, or misuse the brand and its attributes. Beyond commerce-related threats, these tools are used to identify phishing infrastructure, such as look-alike domains and spoofed authentication pages, which can be used to harvest consumer credentials.

=== Supply chain integrity ===
The implementation of track and trace solutions to capture events as goods move through the legitimate supply chain helps to monitor and detect illicit activities. The control of ordered quantities of products or components from third party suppliers can be made by providing them with secure serialised labels which must be affixed to each item.
