= Self-portrait of Shevchenko (winter 1840/1841) =

Painting by Taras Shevchenko

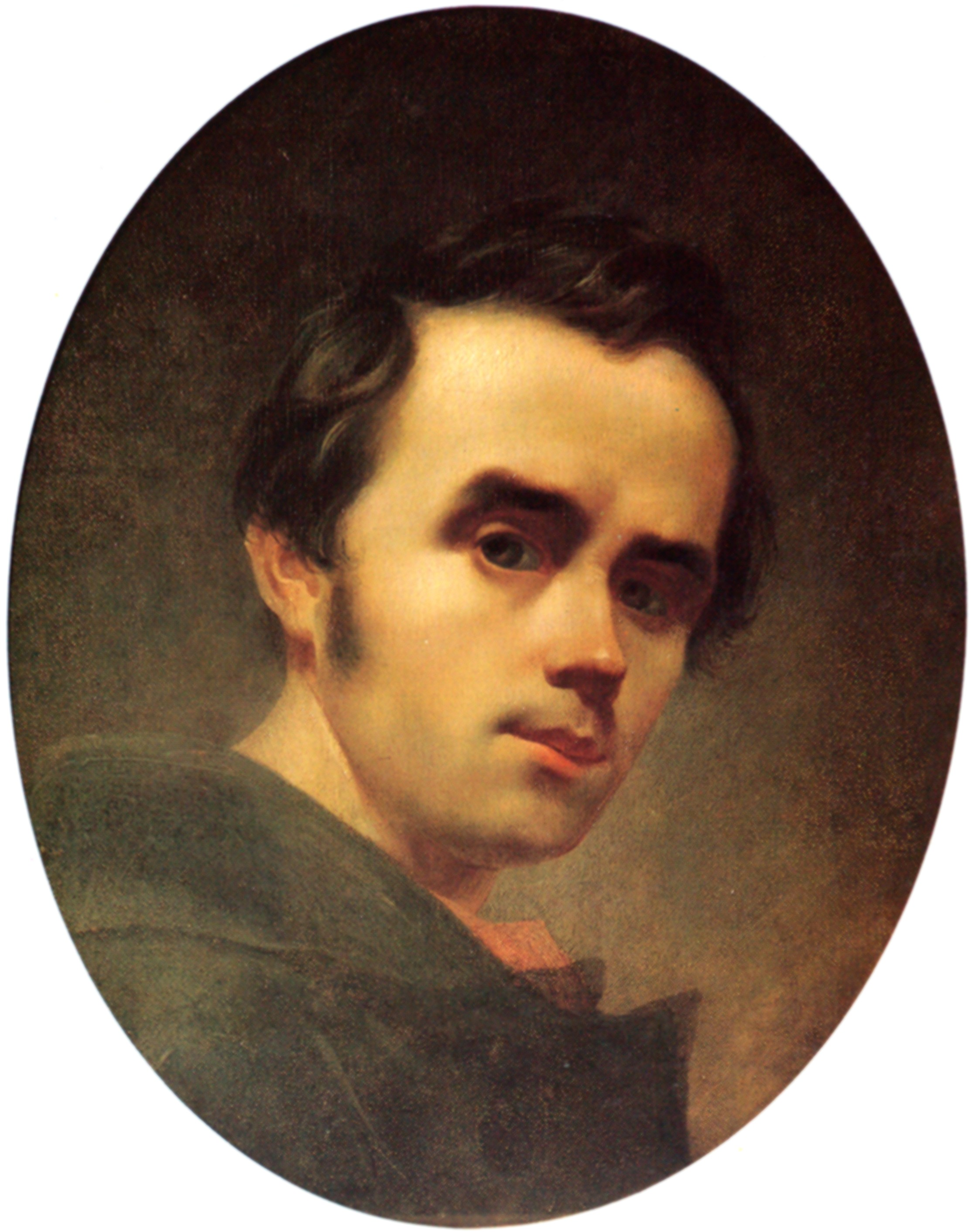
- Taras Shevchenko, Self-portrait
- Artist: Taras Shevchenko
- Year: 1840
- Medium: Oil on Canvas
- Location: National Museum Taras Shevchenko; Kyiv

Shevchenko's self-portrait is among the first of writer and artist Taras Shevchenko's self-portraits, painted in the winter of 1840/1841. Shevchenko would go on to produce approximately thirty self-portraits in a variety of media. The 1840/1841 portrait is used on the Ukraine one hundred-hryvnia bill.

Shevchenko's friend from the Academy of Arts, F. P. Ponomarev, recalls the creation of the work:

I was Shevchenko's closest friend. In the late 1830s and early 1840s we were inseparable almost daily. He lived on Ostrov, in the 5th line, Arenst's house, and I at the Academy of Arts, where I had a workshop given to me for success in drawing and modeling. This workshop (former old church sacristy) consisted of one room with a mezzanine. On these mezzanines, my poor Taras was placed during his serious illness, which consumed our meager means. At that very time, he painted a portrait of himself with oil paints: ... and the torso of St. Sebastian from nature, in the classrooms of the Academy. Next to my studio was the studio of the artist Pyotr Stepanovich Petrovsky, who worked on the Hagar in the Desert program.

Now the picture is in Kyiv in the National Museum of Taras Shevchenko.
