= Security printing =

Field of the printing industry for banknotes and other security products

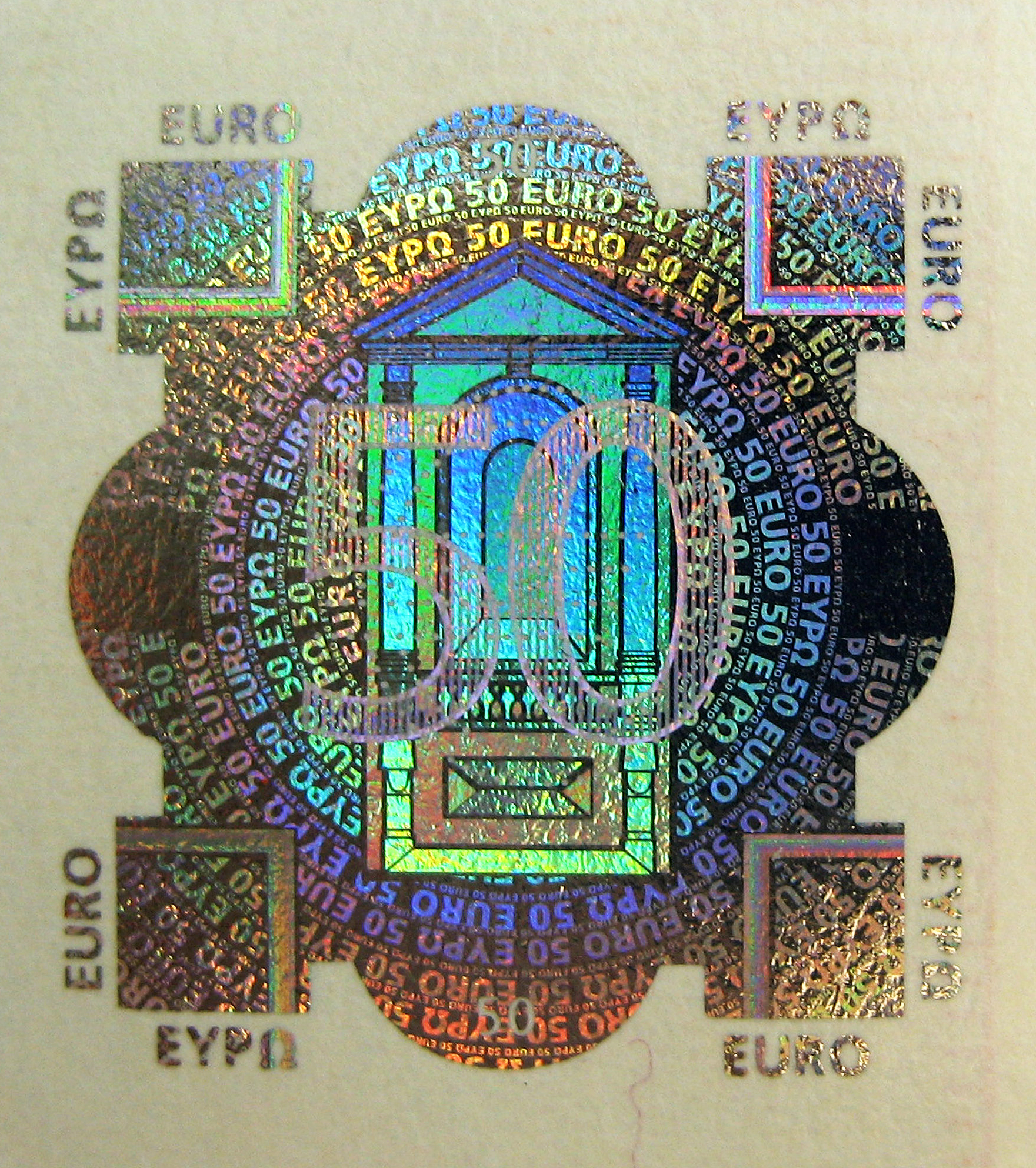
A hologram on a Series 1 (ES1) 50 Euro banknote

Security printing is the field of the printing industry that deals with the printing of items such as banknotes, cheques, passports, tamper-evident labels, security tapes, product authentication, stock certificates, postage stamps, and identity cards. The main goal of security printing is to prevent forgery, tampering, or counterfeiting. More recently many of the techniques used to protect these high-value documents have become more available to commercial printers, whether they are using the more traditional offset and flexographic presses or the newer digital platforms. Businesses are protecting their lesser-value documents such as transcripts, coupons and prescription pads by incorporating some of the features listed below to ensure that they cannot be forged or that alteration of the data cannot occur undetected.

A number of technical methods are used in the security printing industry. Security printing is most often done on security paper, but it can also occur on plastic materials.

== Features detectable by humans ==
Secured documents, such as banknotes, use visible and tactile features to allow humans to verify their authenticity without tools. The European Central Bank (ECB) recommends feel, look, and tilt: First check the tactility of the banknote (including the substrate), then look at the optical design and finally the characteristics of certain optical features when tilting the banknote in relation to the incident light.

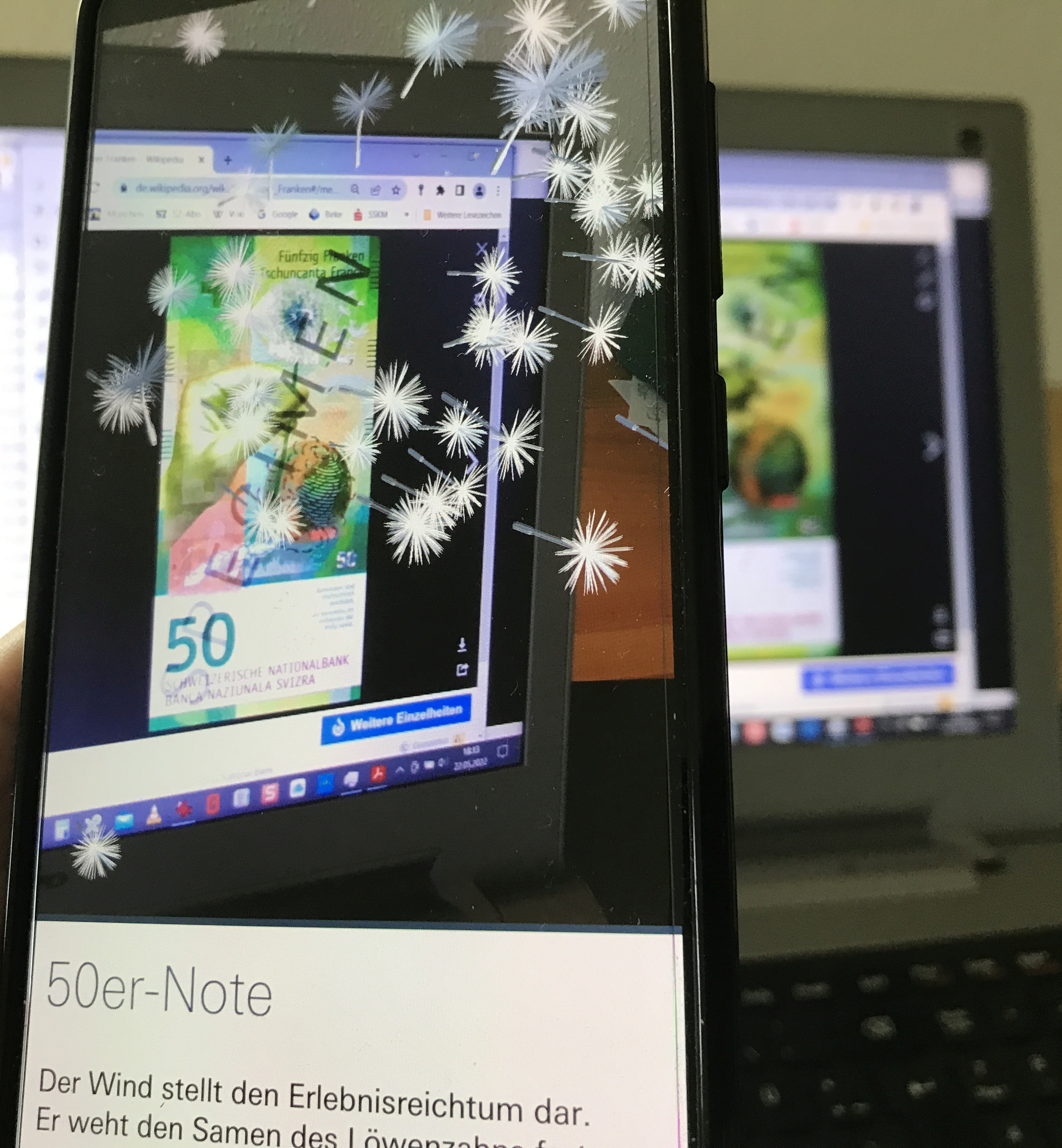
Mobile app SwissBanknotes displaying animated seeds of hawkbit for a 50 Swiss franc on a PC screen

In general, the introduction of a new banknote series is accompanied by information campaigns describing the design and the security features. Several central banks also provide mobile apps explaining the characteristics by interactive methods and enrich them by animated effects. In general, they use the camera of a mobile device to explain the features of a presented banknote. As they do not support the direct verification of authenticity they also work with simple printouts or screen displays.

- SwissBanknotes from the Swiss National Bank for the Swiss franc with animated effects
- MalawiKwacha from the Reserve Bank of Malawi for the Malawian kwacha with simulations of tilting and tactility as well as interactive effects by enhanced reality
- SARBCurrency from the South African Reserve Bank for the South African rand as an offline application explaining the security features by enhanced reality
- Lilangeni from the Central Bank of Eswatini for the Swazi lilangeni with simulations of tilting and tactility as well as interactive effects by enhanced reality

=== Substrate ===
==== Paper ====
The substrate of most banknotes is made of paper, almost always from cotton fibres for strength and durability; in some cases linen or specially coloured or forensic fibres are added to give the paper added individuality and protect against counterfeiting. Paper substrate may also include windows based on laser-cut holes covered by a security foil with holographic elements. All of this makes it difficult to reproduce using common counterfeiting techniques.

==== Polymer ====
Some countries, including Canada, Nigeria, Romania, Mexico, Hong Kong, New Zealand, Israel, Singapore, Malaysia, United Kingdom, and Australia, produce polymer (plastic) banknotes, to improve longevity and to make counterfeiting more difficult. Polymer can include transparent windows, diffraction grating, and raised printing.

Transparent Windows

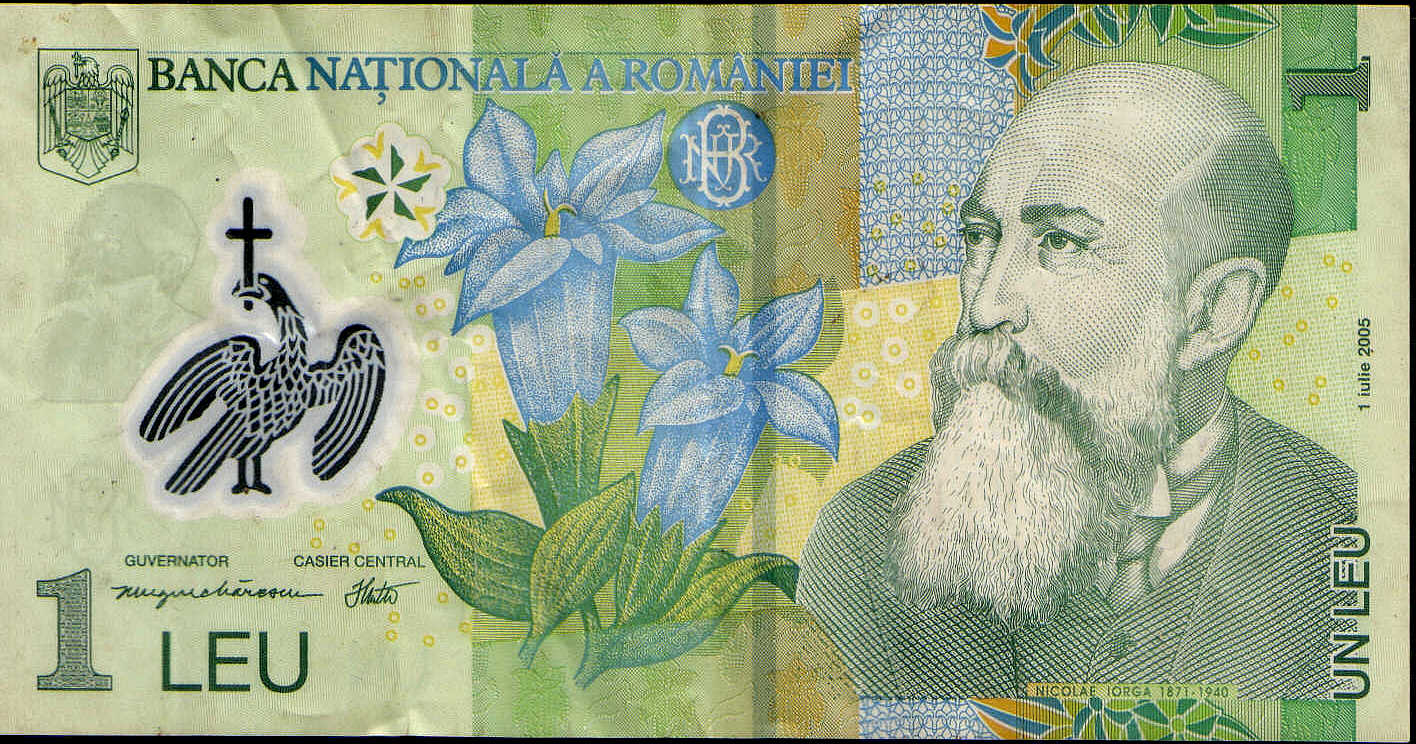
Obverse of 1 Romanian Leu banknote (series 2005) with partially overprinted window on the left (polymer substrate)

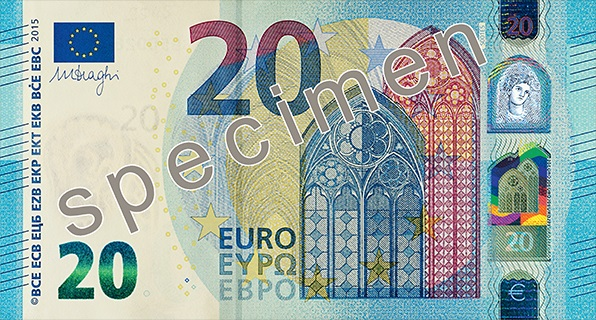
Obverse of 20 euro banknote (series ES2) with holographic foil over the window (upper right side) (paper substrate)

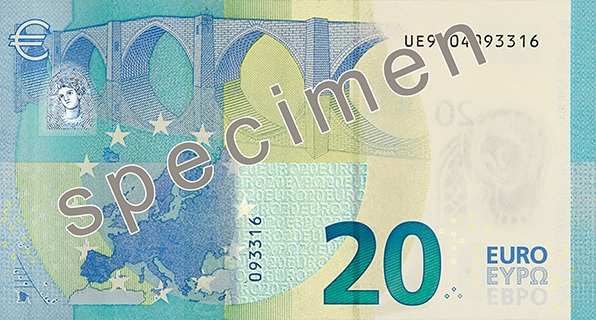
Reverse of 20 euro banknote (series ES2) with holographic foil over the window (upper left side)

==== Format ====
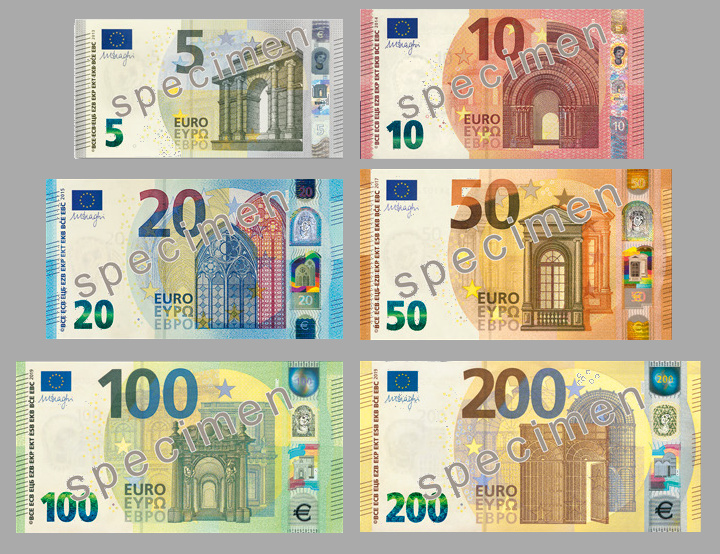
Differing length and width of euro banknotes (series ES2)

Most currencies use different dimensions of length, width, or both for the different denominations, with smaller formats for the lower denominations and larger formats for the higher denominations, to hinder reuse of the substrate with embedded security features for counterfeiting higher denominations.

Blind and visually impaired people may also rely on the format for distinguishing between the denominations.

=== Visible security features ===
==== Watermark ====
True watermark

A true watermark is a recognizable image or pattern in paper that appears lighter or darker than surrounding paper when viewed with a light from behind the paper, due to paper density variations. A watermark is made by impressing a water coated metal stamp or dandy roll onto the paper during manufacturing. Watermarks were first introduced in Bologna, Italy in 1282; as well as their use in security printing, they have also been used by paper makers to identify their product. For proofing the authenticity, the thinner part of the watermark will shine brighter with a light source in the background and darker with a dark background. The watermark is a proven anti-counterfeit technology because most counterfeits only simulate its appearance by using a printing pattern.

Watermarks in Paper Substrate

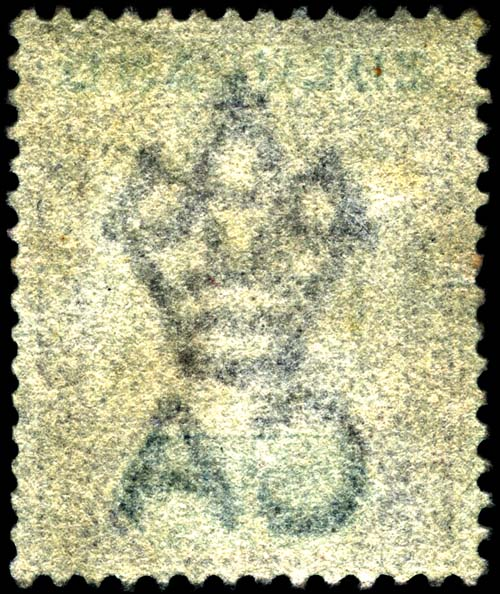
Watermark in a postage stamp from Zululand (around 1900)

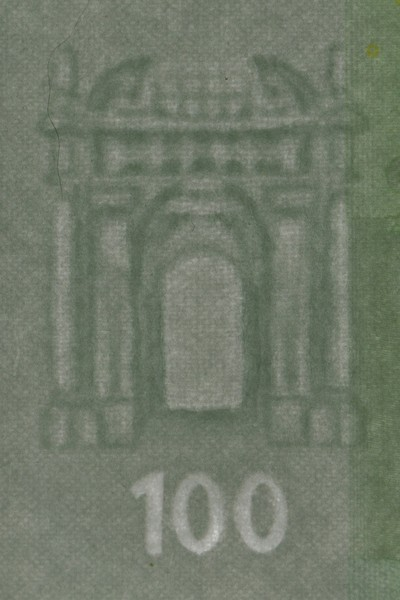
Watermark in a 100 euro (series ES1) from European Central Bank

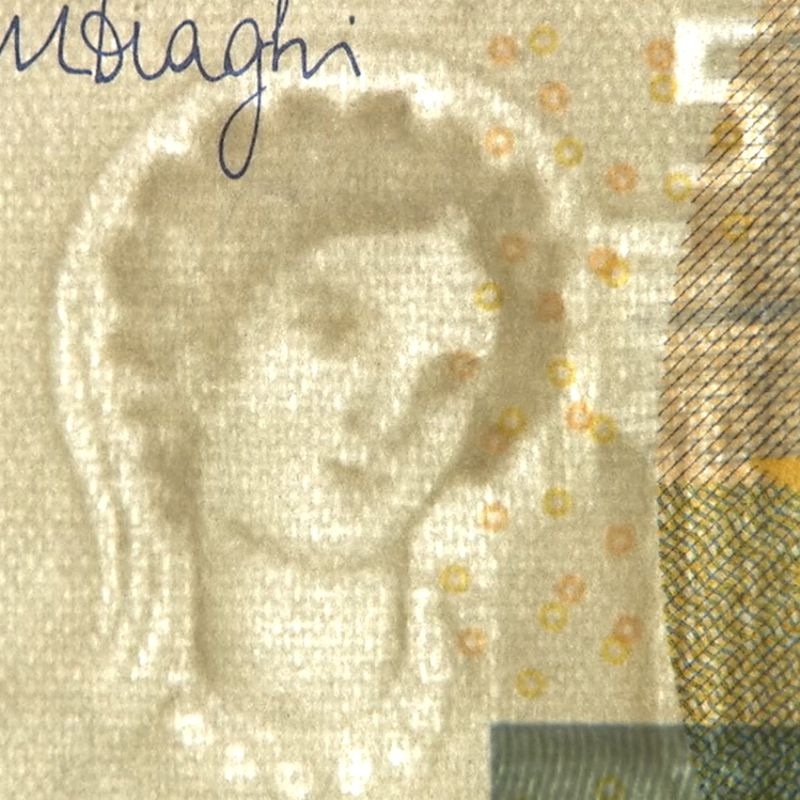
Watermark in a 5 euro (series ES2) from European Central Bank

Simulated watermark

Printed with white ink, simulated watermarks have a different reflectance than the base paper and can be seen at an angle. Because the ink is white, it cannot be photocopied or scanned. A similar effect can be achieved by iriodin varnish which creates reflections under certain viewing angles only and is transparent otherwise.

Watermarks are sometimes simulated on polymer currency by printing an according pattern, but with little anti-counterfeiting effect. For example, the Australian dollar has its coat of arms watermarked on all its plastic bills. A Diffractive Optical Element (DOE) within the transparent window can create a comparable effect but requires a laser beam for its verification.

==== See-through register ====
See-through registers are based on complementary patterns on the obverse and reverse of the banknote and constitute a complete pattern under backlight conditions. Examples are the D of the Deutsche Mark (1989 series, BBk III) and the value number of the first series of euro banknotes (ES1). Counterfeiting is difficult because the printing registration requires an extremely high printing accuracy on both sides and minor deviations are easily detectable.

See-through registers

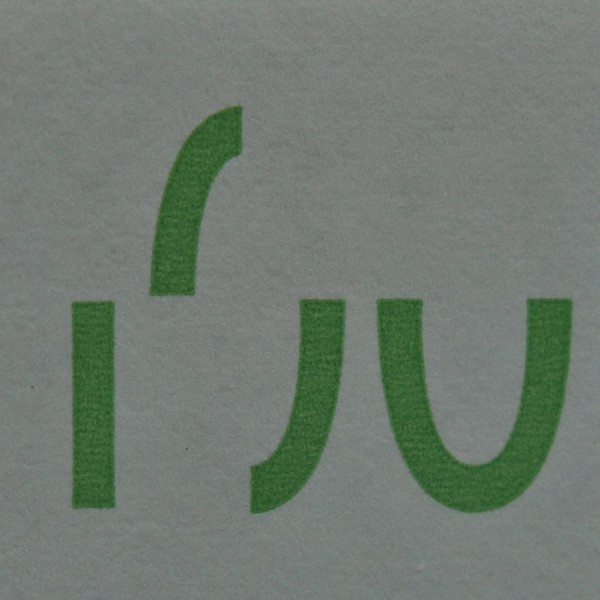
See-through register of EUR 100 (ES1) (obverse)

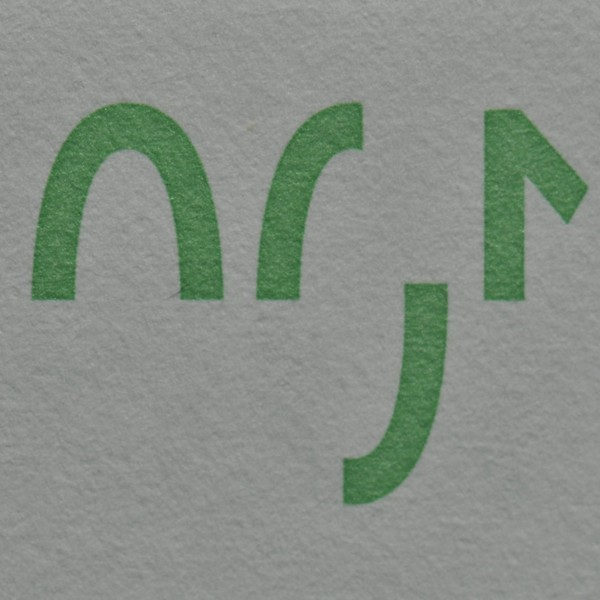
See-through register of EUR 100 (ES1) (reverse)

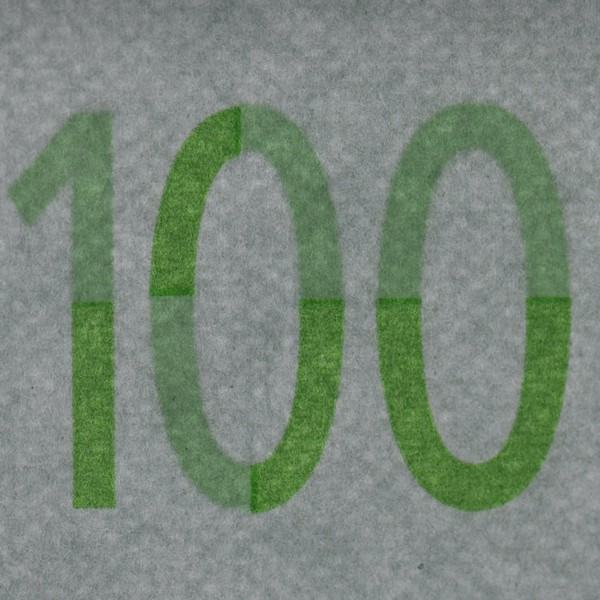
See-through register of EUR 100 (ES1) (transmission)

==== See-through window ====
Polymer banknotes which are printed on a basically transparent substrate easily provide clear areas by sparing the white coating. This window may be overprinted by patterns. Initially this was the main human security feature for polymer banknotes which cannot use watermark or security threads. It attracted counterfeiting of large volumes when printing technology for polymer substrate became commonly available. Therefore new designs additionally laminate this window with an ultra-thin security foil, e.g., on the Frontier series of the Canadian dollar which was issued from 2011, and the Australian dollar (2nd series) issued from 2016.

A very similar security feature is achieved with banknotes on paper substrate. For this an area of up to 300 mm² is punched out and sealed with a partially transparent security foil. The ES2 series of euro banknotes is using this feature for the higher denominations (EUR 20 and above) and calls it portrait window. The European Central Bank (ECB) recommends to look at the banknote against the light – the window in the hologram becomes transparent and reveals a portrait of Europa on both sides of the note.

See-through windows

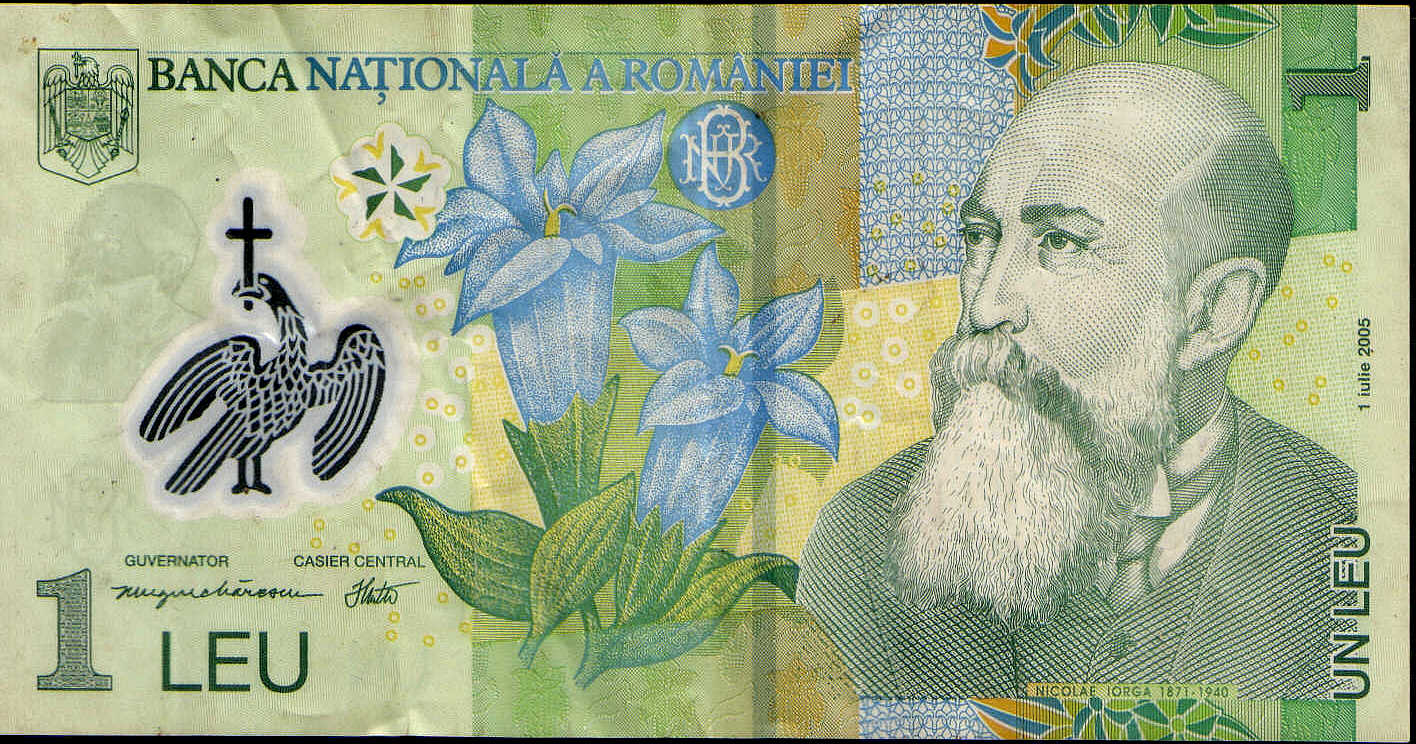
Obverse of Romanian RON 1 (series 2005) with overprinted window (polymer substrat)

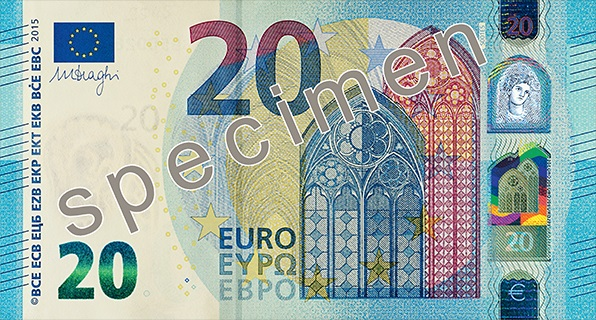
Obverse of EUR 20 (ES2) with holographic foil over the see-through window (top right)

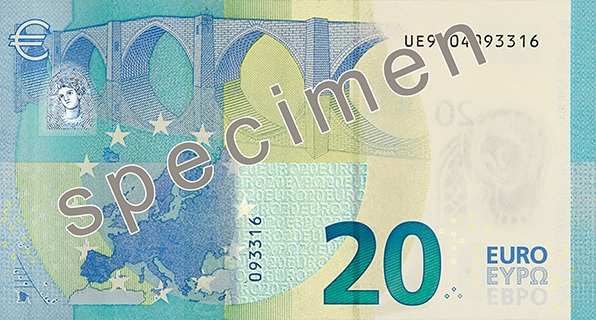
Reverse of EUR 20 (ES2) with transparent foil over the see-through window (top left)

==== Micro-perforation ====
Micro-perforation is used as Microperf in the Swiss franc and the Romanian leu. Very small holes are punched or laser-engraved into the substrate or a foil application without generating a crater. In backlight illumination, the holes form a pattern, e.g., the value numeral like in the SFR 20 (eighth series).

==== Geometric lathe work ====
A guilloché is an ornamental pattern formed of two or more curved bands that interlace to repeat a circular design. They are made with a geometric lathe.

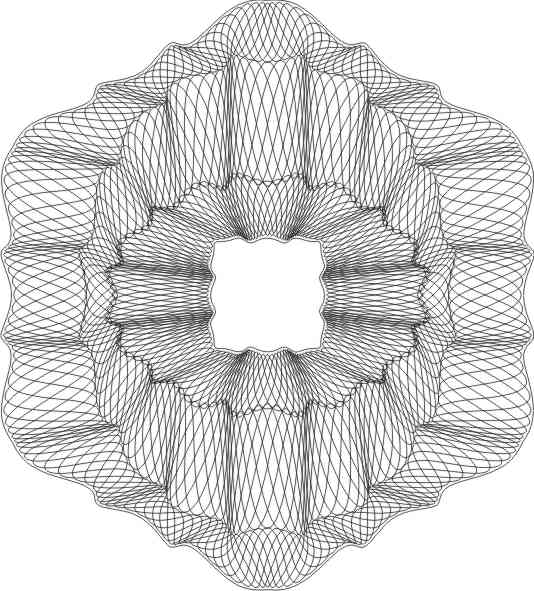
A guilloché

==== Microprinting ====
This involves the use of extremely small text, and is most often used on currency and bank checks. The text is generally small enough to be indiscernible to the naked eye without either close inspection or the use of a magnifying glass. Cheques, for example, use microprint as the signature line.

Enlarged microprinting

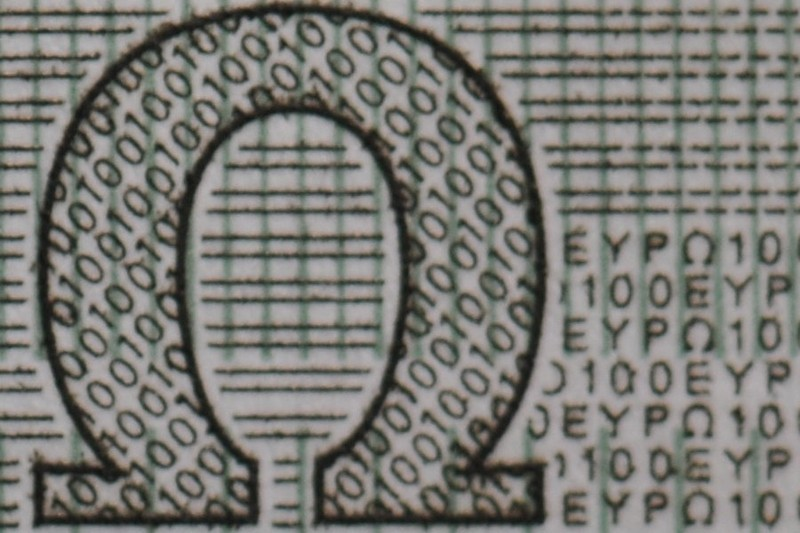
Obverse of 100 euro (series ES1) (lower left)

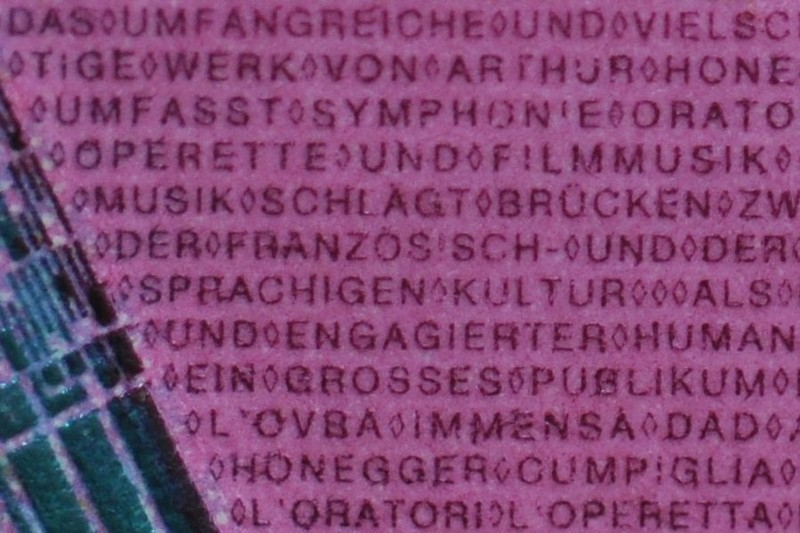
Obverse of 20 Swiss franc (8th series)

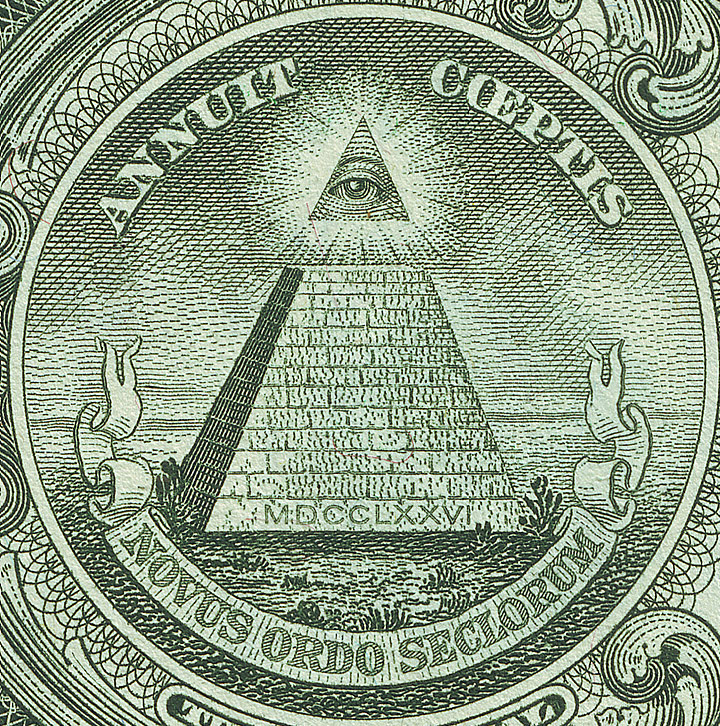
Obverse of 1 US dollar with microprinting and guilloché in the pyramid

==== Optically variable ink ====
Optically Variable Ink (OVI) displays different colors depending on the angle at which it is viewed. It uses mica-based glitter. As an example, the euro banknotes use this feature as the emerald number on the ES2 series. The ECB recommends to "tilt the banknote". The shiny number in the bottom left corner displays an effect of the light that moves up and down. The number also changes colour from emerald green to deep blue. The EUR 100 and EUR 200 banknotes also show € symbols inside the number.

Coloured magnetizable inks are prepared by including chromatic pigments of high colour strength. The magnetic pigments’ strong inherent colour generally reduces the spectrum of achievable shades. Generally, pigments should be used at high concentrations to ensure that sufficient magnetizable material is applied even in thin offset coats. Some magnetic pigment are best suited for coloured magnetizable inks due to their lower blackness.

Homogeneous magnetization (no preferred orientation) is easily obtained on pigment made of spherical particles. Best results are achieved when remanence and coercive field strength are very low and the saturating magnetization is high.

When pearlescent pigments are viewed at different angles the angle of the light as it's perceived makes the colour appear to change as the magnetic fields within the particles shift direction.

Optically variable ink

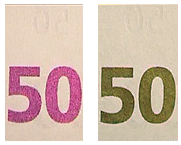
OVI of 50 euro (series ES1)

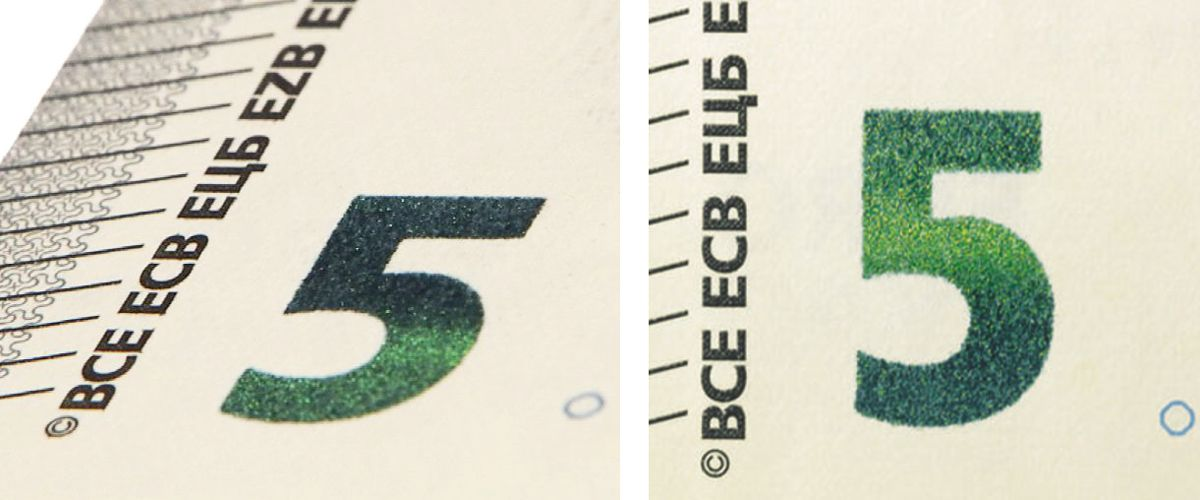
Emerald number of 5 euro (series ES2)

==== Holograms ====
A hologram may be embedded either via hot-stamping foil, wherein an extremely thin layer of only a few micrometers of depth is bonded into the paper or a plastic substrate by means of a hot-melt adhesive (called a size coat) and heat from a metal die, or it may be directly embossed as holographic paper, or onto the laminate of a card itself. When incorporated with a custom design pattern or logo, hologram hot stamping foils become security foils that protect credit cards, passports, bank notes and value documents from counterfeiting. Holograms help in curtailing forging, and duplication of products hence are very essential for security purposes. Once stamped on a product, they cannot be removed or forged, enhancing the product at the same time. Also from a security perspective, if stamped, a hologram is a superior security device as it is virtually impossible to remove from its substrate.

Foils with holograms

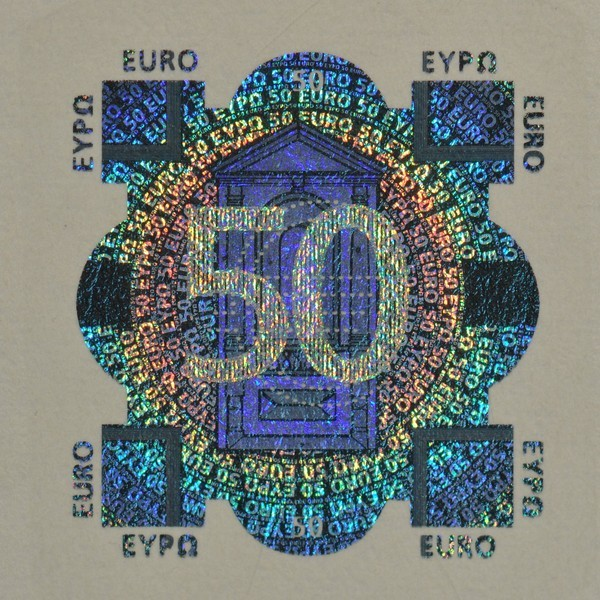
Hologram on a 50 euro (series ES1)

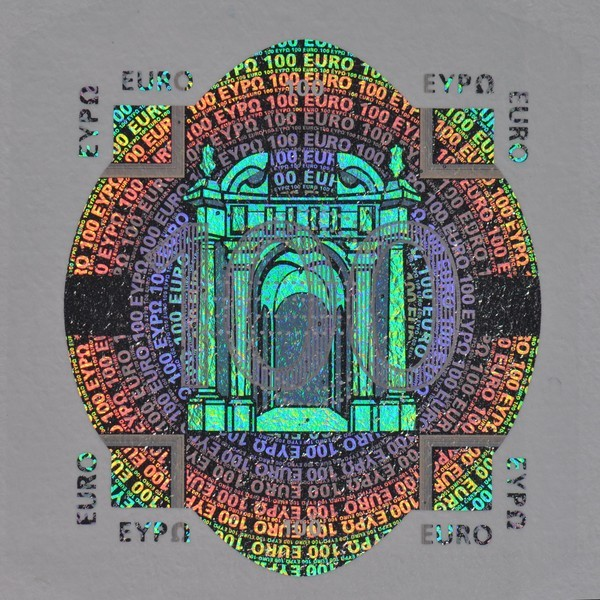
Hologram on a 100 euro (series ES1)

==== Security threads ====
Metal threads and foils, from simple iridescent features to foil colour copying to foils with additional optically variable effects are often used.

There are two kinds of security threads. One is a thin aluminum coated and partly de-metallized polyester film thread with microprinting which is embedded in the security paper as banknote or passport paper. The other kind of security thread is the single or multicolour sewing thread made from cotton or synthetic fibers, mostly UV fluorescent, for the bookbinding of passport booklets. In recent designs the security thread was enhanced with other security features such as holograms or three-dimensional effects when tilted.

On occasion, the banknote designers succumb to the Titanic effect (excess belief in the latest technology), and place too much faith in some particular trick. An example is the forgery of British banknotes in the 1990s. British banknotes in the 1990s featured a "windowed" metal strip through the paper about 1 mm wide that comes to the paper surface every 8 mm. When examined in reflected light, it appears to have a dotted metallic line running across it, but when viewed through transmitted light, the metal strip is dark and solid.

Duplicating this was thought to be difficult, but a criminal gang was able to reproduce it quickly. They used a cheap hot-stamping process to lay down a metal strip on the surface of the paper, then printed a pattern of solid bars over it using white ink to leave the expected metal pattern visible. At their trial, they were found to have forged tens of millions of pounds’ worth of notes over a period of years.

Security threads

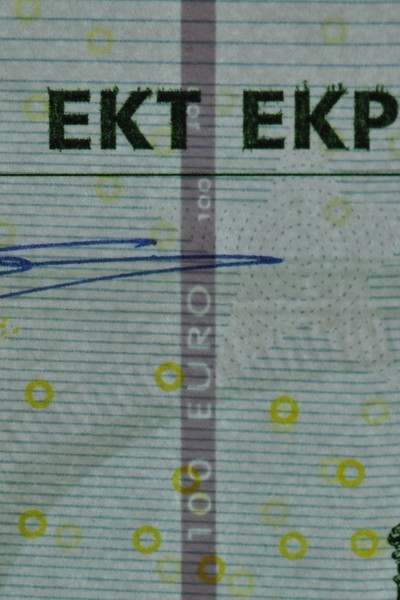
Security thread of 100 euro (series ES1) (only visible in transmitted light)

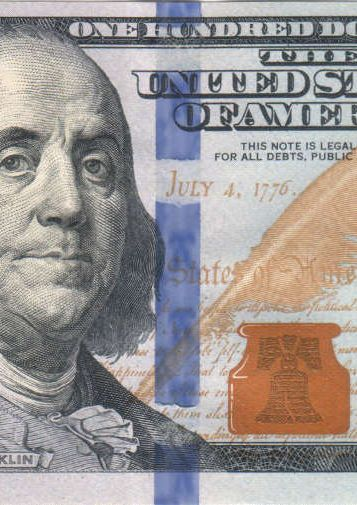
Security thread of 100 US dollar (series 2009) with the 3D security ribbon

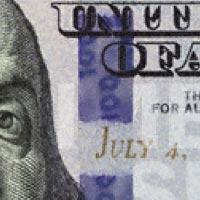
Details of 3D security ribbon on 100 US dollar

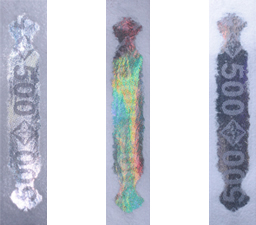
Security thread of 500 Russian ruble (series 2010) with hologram

==== Prismatic colouration ====
The use of colour can greatly assist the prevention of forgeries. By including a colour on a document, a colour photocopier must be used in attempting to make a copy. However, the use of these machines also tends to enhance the effectiveness of other technologies such as Void Pantographs and Verification Grids.

By using two or more colors in the background and blending them together, a prismatic effect can be created. This can be done on either a traditional or a digital press. When a document using this technique is attempted to be photocopied, the scanning and re-creation by a colour copier is inexact, usually resulting in banding or blotching, and thereby immediate recognition of the document as being a copy.

A frequent example of prismatic colouring is on checks where it is combined with other techniques such as the void pantograph, to increase the difficulty of successful counterfeiting.

==== Copy-evidence ====
Sometimes only the original document has value. An original, signed cheque for example has value but a photocopy of it does not. An original prescription script can be filled but a photocopy of it should not be. Copy-evident technologies provide security to hard copy documents by helping distinguish between the original document and the copy.

The most common technology to help differentiate originals from copies is the void pantograph. Void pantographs are essentially invisible to the untrained, naked eye on an original but when scanned or copied the layout of lines, dots and dashes will reveal a word (frequently VOID and hence the name) or symbol that clearly allows the copy to be identified. This technology is available on both traditional presses (offset and flexographic) and on the newer digital platforms. The advantage of a digital press is that in a single pass through the printer a void pantograph with all the variable data can be printed on plain paper.

Copy-evident paper, sometimes marketed as ‘security paper’, is pre-printed void pantograph paper that was usually produced on an offset or flexographic press. The quality of the void pantograph is usually quite good because it was produced on a press with a very high resolution, and, when only a small number of originals are to be printed, it can be a cost-effective solution; however, the advent of the digital printer has rapidly eroded this benefit.

A second technology which complements and enhances the effectiveness of the void pantograph is the Verification Grid. This technology is visible on the original, usually as fine lines or symbols, but when photocopied these lines and images disappear—‌the inverse reaction of the void pantograph. The most common examples of this technology are on the fine lines at the edge of a cheque which will disappear when copied or on a coupon when a symbol, such as a shopping cart, disappears when an unauthorized copy is made. Verification Grid is available for either traditional or digital presses.

Together the void pantograph and the Verification Grid complement each other because the reactions to copying are inverse, resulting in a higher degree of assurance that a hard copy document is an original.

==== Registration of features on both sides ====
Banknotes are typically printed with fine alignment (so-called see-through registration window) between the offset printing on each side of the note. This allows the note to be examined for this feature, and provides opportunities to unambiguously align other features of the note with the printing. Again, this is difficult to imitate accurately enough in most print shops.

See-through registration

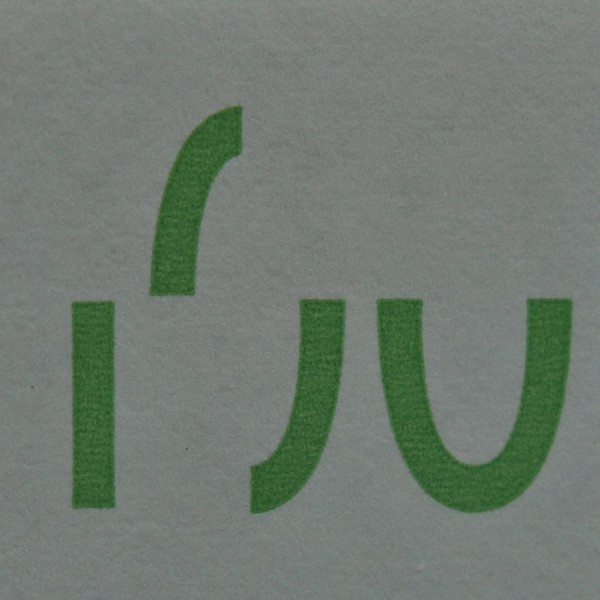
Registration pattern of 100 euro (series ES1) (obverse)

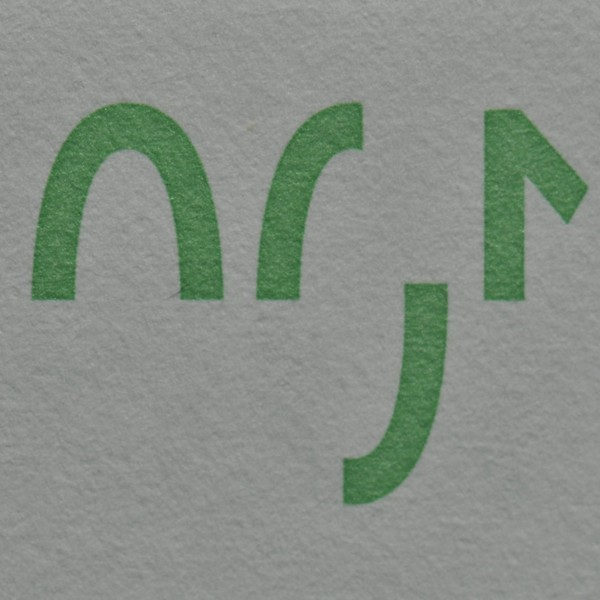
Registration pattern of 100 euro (series ES1) (reverse)

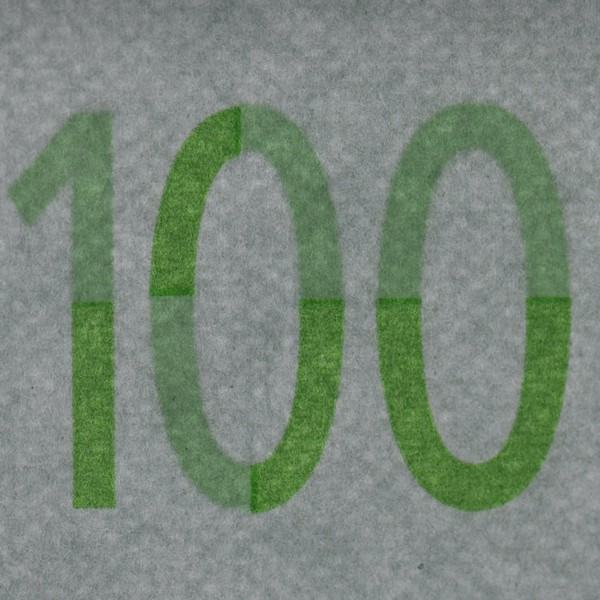
Registration pattern of 100 euro (series ES1) (transmission)

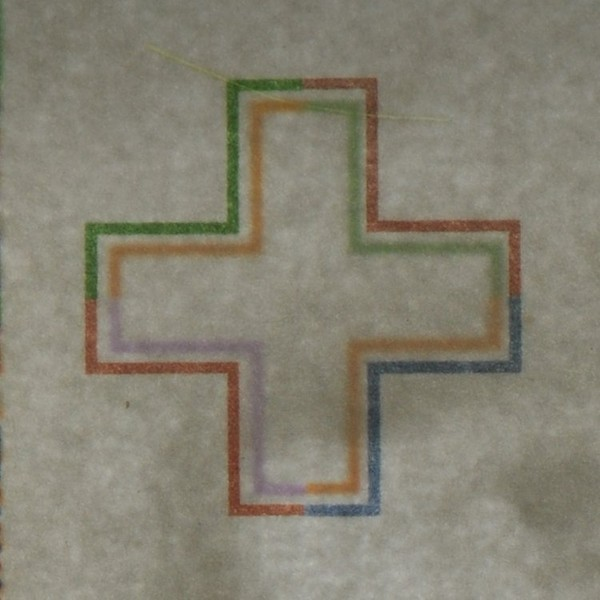
Registration pattern of 50 Swiss franc (8th series) (transmission)

==== Thermochromic ink ====
Several types of ink are available which change colour with temperature. Security ink with a normal "trigger" temperature of 88 °F (31 °C), which will either disappear or change colors when the ink is rubbed, usually by the fingertips. This is based on a thermochromic effect.

==== Serial numbers ====
Serial numbers help make legitimate documents easier to track and audit. However, they are barely useful as a security feature because duplicates of an existing serial number are not easily detectable, except for a series of identical counterfeits.

To support correct identification serial numbers normally have a check digit to verify the correct reading of the serial number. In banknote printing the unique serial number provides effective means for the monitoring and verification of the production volume. In some cases the recording of serial numbers may help to track and identify banknotes from blackmail or robbery.

In most currencies the serial number is printed on two edges of the banknotes to aggravate the making of so-called composed banknotes by combining parts of different banknotes. Even if made from genuine banknotes, most central banks consider such items as manipulated banknotes without value if the serial numbers do not match.

Serial numbers of banknotes

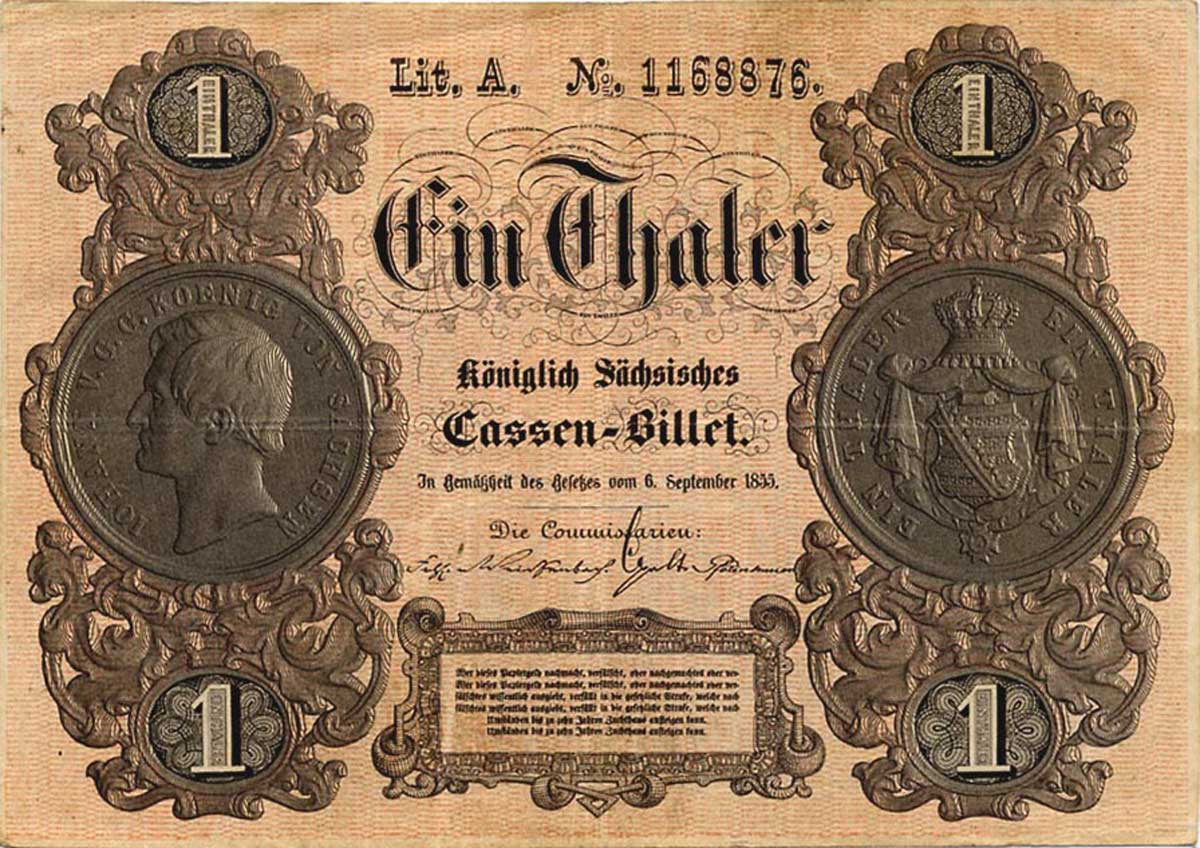
1 German thaler issued on 6 September 1855

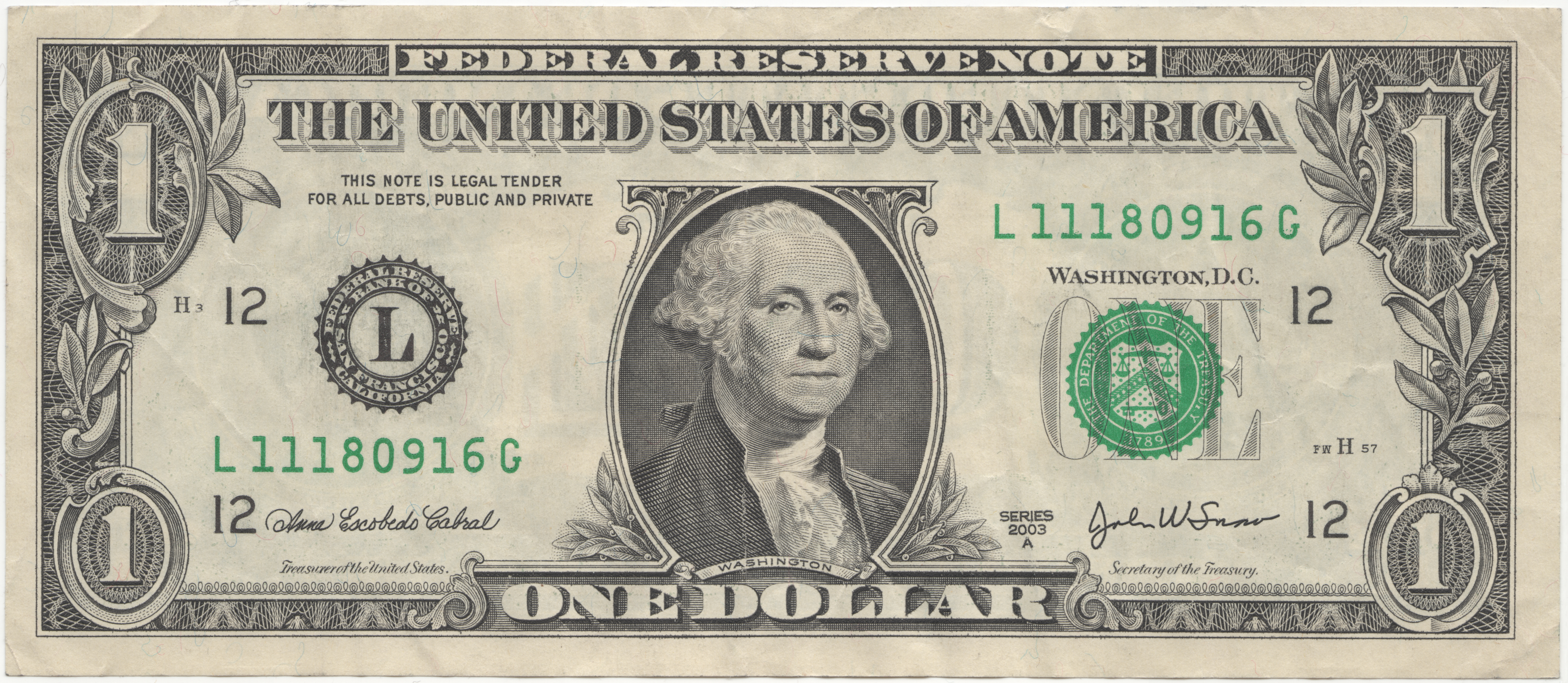
US dollar (series 2003) with green serial number

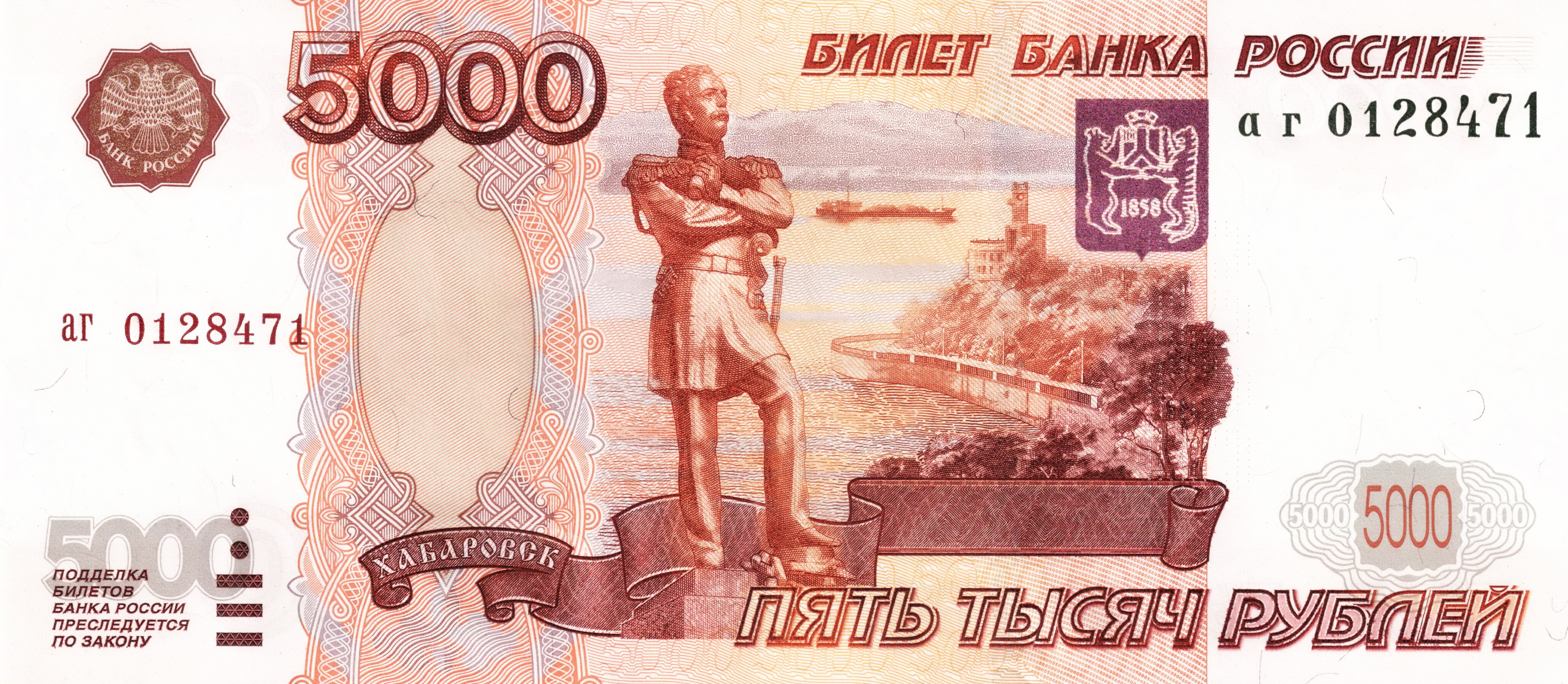
Russian ruble (series 2006) with variable font size (right)

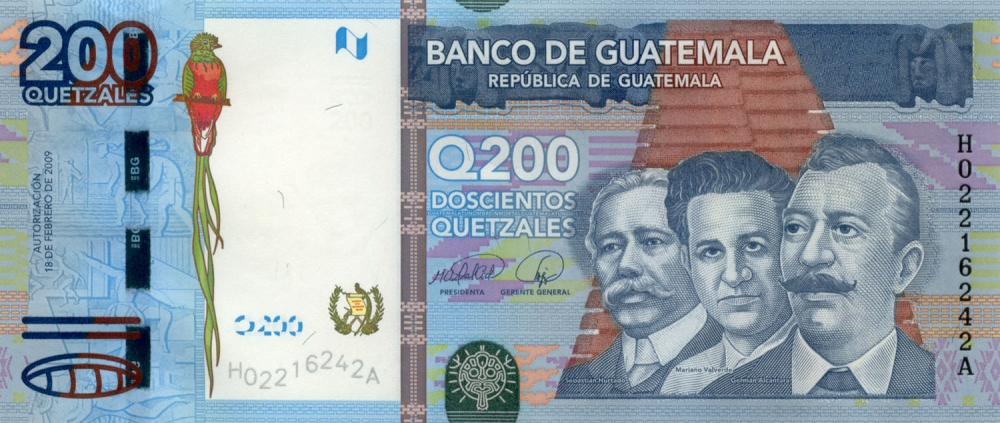
200 Guatemalan quetzal with laser-engraved serial number (in the white area)

=== Tactile security features ===
==== Paper feeling ====
Security paper for banknotes is different from standard paper due to special ingredients like fibers from cotton, linen or abaca. Together with intaglio printing crisp feeling provides an excellent tactile perception (crisp feeling) to reject counterfeits which are based on standard paper with cellulose fibers. Polymer substrates and limp banknotes on paper substrate do not offer this tactile characteristic.

==== Intaglio printing ====
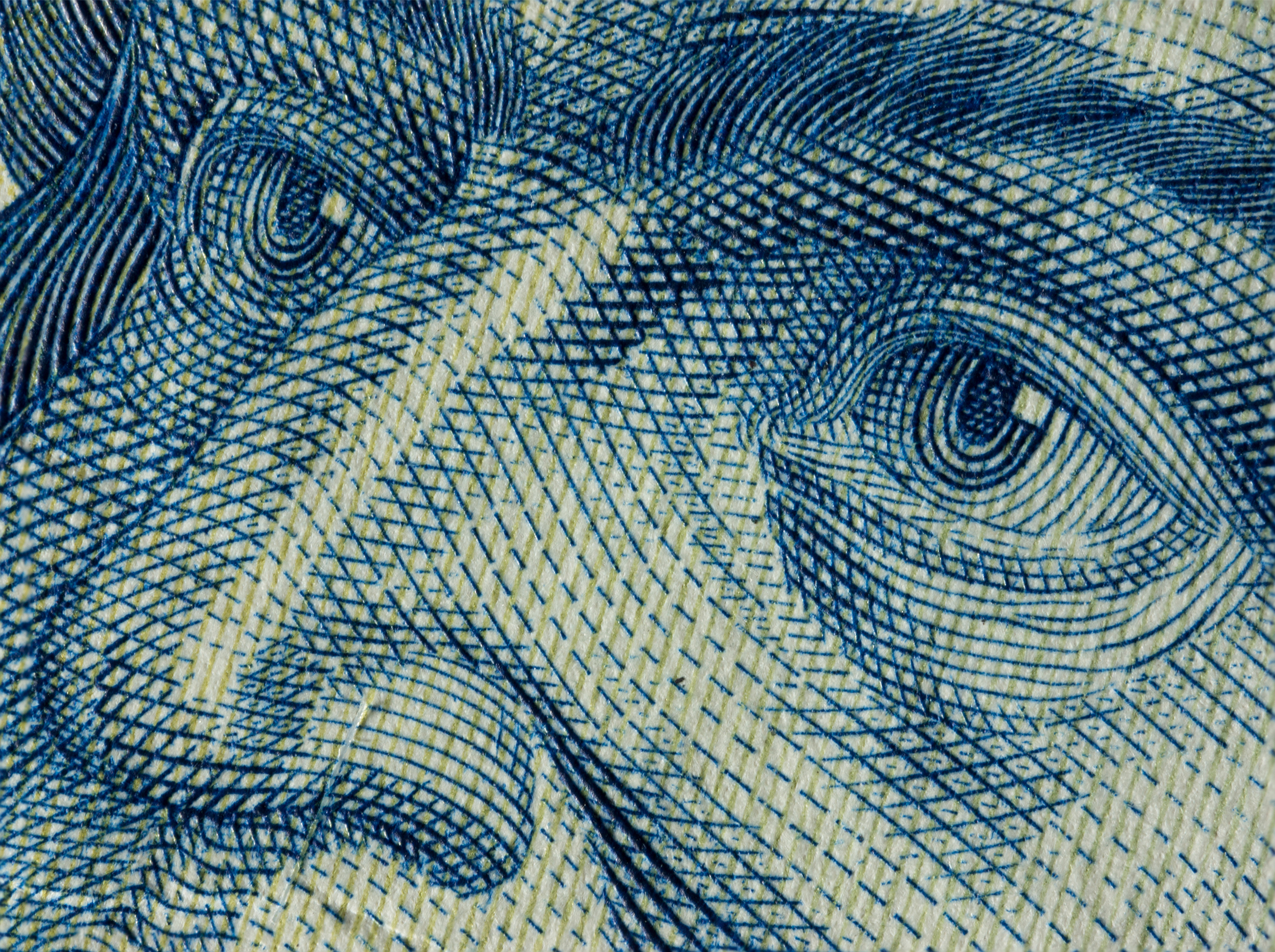
Tactile intaglio printing on 1,000 Hungarian forint (series 2018)

Intaglio printing is a technique in which the image is incised into a surface. Normally, copper or zinc plates are used, and the incisions are created by etching or engraving the image, but one may also use mezzotint. In printing, the surface is covered in ink, and then rubbed vigorously with tarlatan cloth or newspaper to remove the ink from the surface, leaving it in the incisions. A damp piece of paper is placed on top, and the plate and paper are run through a printing press that, through pressure, transfers the ink to the paper.

The very sharp printing obtained from the intaglio process is hard to imitate by other means. Intaglio also allows for the creation of latent images which are only visible when the document is viewed at a very shallow angle.

The mobile app ValiCash from Koenig & Bauer evaluates specific characteristics of the intaglio printing of euro banknotes printed on paper substrate. It is available for iOS devices and takes a picture of the banknote. Within a few seconds it determines abnormality by a message "not successful" but cannot finally identify counterfeits.

==== Embossing ====
The substrate may be embossed to create raised designs as tactile security feature. It may be combined with intaglio printing. As an example, the euro series ES2 has a different pattern of lines at the short edges of the banknote to support blind people in distinguishing the denominations.

== Security features detectable with simple tools ==
=== Test pen ===
A counterfeit banknote detection pen can be used to quickly determine the starch in wood-based paper substrate. While genuine banknotes hardly change color at all, counterfeits turn black or blue immediately. This method, which is not very reliable – there is no color change on newsprint – is often used in the retail trade for reasons of cost and time.

=== Halo ===
Carefully created images can be hidden in the background or in a picture on a document. These images cannot be seen without the help of an inexpensive lens of a specific line screening. When placed over the location of the image and rotated the image becomes visible. If the document is photocopied the Halo image is lost. A known implementation is Scrambled Indicia.

Halo can be printed on traditional or digital presses. The advantage of traditional presses is that multiple images can be overlaid in the same location and become visible in turn as the lens is rotated.

Halo is used as a technique to authenticate the originality of the document and may be used to verify critical information within the document. For example, the value of a coupon might be encoded as a Halo image that could be verified at the time of redemption or similarly the seat number on a sporting event ticket.

=== Latent images ===
Pressure-sensitive or hot stamped labels characterized with a normal (gray or colored) appearance. When viewed via a special filter (such as a polarizer) an additional, normally latent, image appears. With intaglio printing, a similar effect may be achieved for viewing the banknote from a slanted angle.

=== False-positive testing ===
False-positive testing derives its name because the testing requires both a false and a positive reaction to authenticate a document. The most common instance is the widely available counterfeit detector marker seen in many banks and stores.

Counterfeit detector markers use a chemical interaction with the substrate, usually paper, of a document turning it a particular color. Usually a marker turns newsprint black and leaves currency or specially treated areas on a document clear or gold. The reaction and coloring varies depending upon the formulation. Banknotes, being a specially manufactured substrate, usually behave differently than standard newsprint or other paper and this difference is how counterfeits are detected by the markers.

False-positive testing can also be done on documents other than currencies as a means to test their authenticity. With the stroke of a marker a symbol, word or value can be revealed that will allow the user to quickly verify the document, such as a coupon. In more advanced applications the marker creates a barcode which can be scanned for verification or reference to other data within the document resulting in a higher degree of assurance of authenticity.

Photocopied documents will lack the special characteristics of the substrate, and so are easily detectable. False-positive testing generally is a one-time test, because once done, the results remain visible, so while useful as part of a coupon, this technique is not suitable for ID badges, for example.

=== Fluorescent dyes ===
Fluorescent dyes react with fluorescence under ultraviolet light or other unusual lighting. These show up as words, patterns or pictures and may be visible or invisible under normal lighting. This feature is also incorporated into many banknotes and other documents - e.g. Northern Ireland NHS prescriptions show a picture of local '8th wonder' the Giant's Causeway in UV light. Some producers include multi-frequency fluorescence, such that different elements fluoresce under specific frequencies of light. Phosphorescence may accompany fluorescence and shows an after-glow when the UV light is switched off.

Fluorescence of 50 euro banknote (series ES1)

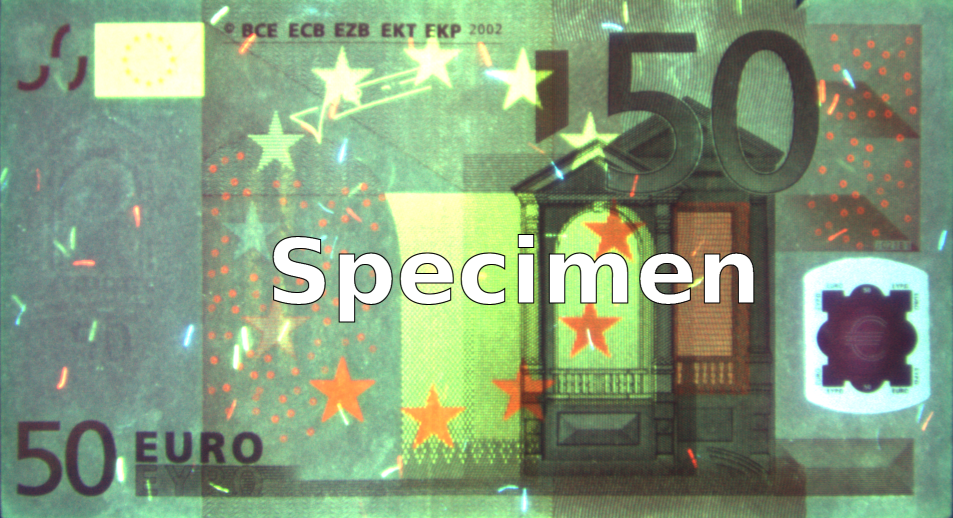
Obverse at 350 nm
The foil of the kinegram (bottom right) and colored fibres show up

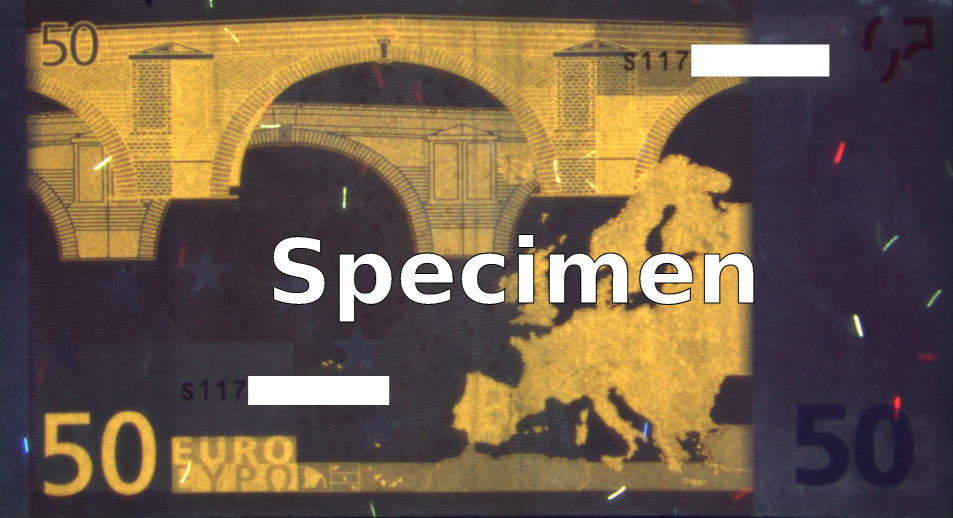
Reverse at 350 nm
The colored fibres are clearly visible

=== Infrared characteristics ===
Inks may have identical color characteristics in the visible spectrum, but may differ in the infrared spectrum.

Infrared characteristics of a €50 banknote (ES1)

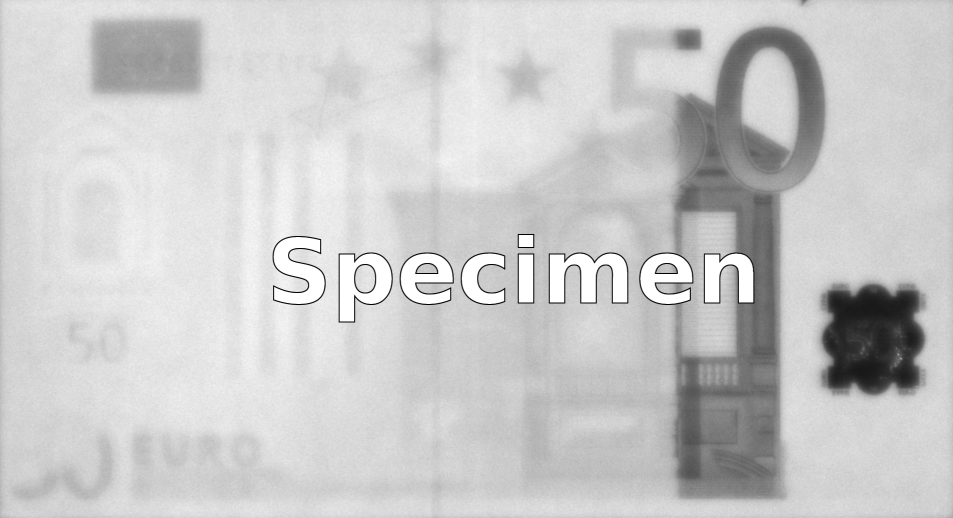
Obverse illuminated at 700 nm: partially disappearing colors which appear identical in the CMYK color model.

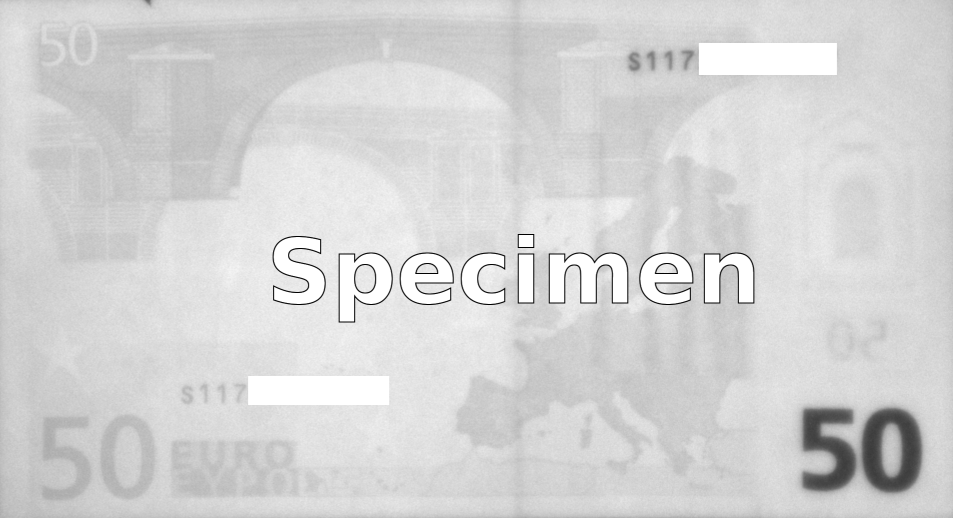
Reverse illuminated at 700 nm: The serial number (left bottom) nearly disappears.

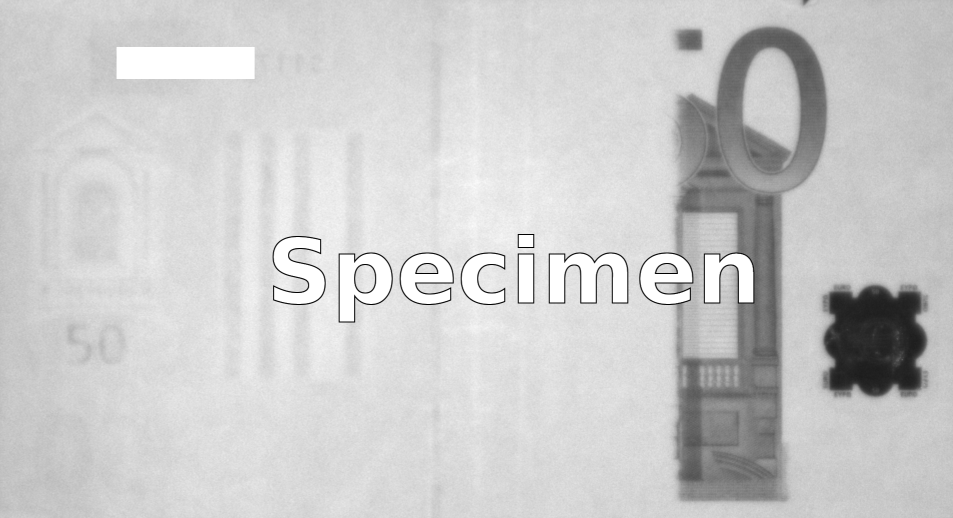
Obverse illuminated at 1000 nm: Most color absorption has disappeared (the Europe flag top left). The watermark is easily detectable.

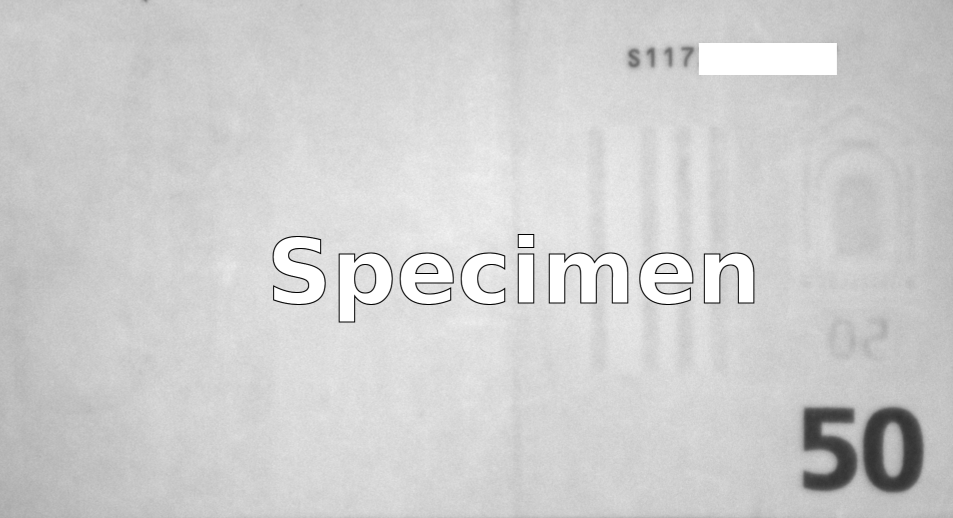
Reverse illuminated at 1000 nm: All color absorptions have disappeared except the 50 (bottom right) and the serial number (top right).

== Machine-readable security features ==
Machine-readable features are used in passports for border control and in banknote processing.

- The commercial market is using Level 2 features (L2) which are partly disclosed by the central banks. This applies for cash handling machines, such as automated teller machines and ticket machines.
- The central banks are additionally using Level 3 features (L3) which are kept completely secret. They are necessary to maintain the integrity of cash in circulation and isolate professional counterfeiting.

Following is a partial list of machine-readable security features:

=== Magnetic ink ===
Because of the speed with which they can be read by computer systems, magnetic ink character recognition is used extensively in banking, primarily for personal checks. The ink used in magnetic ink character recognition (MICR) technology is also used to greatly reduce errors in automated (or computerized) reading. The pigment is dispersed in a binder system (resin, solvent) or a wax compound and applied either by pressing or by hot melt to a carrier film (usually polyethylene).

Some people believe that the magnetic ink was intended as a fraud prevention concept, yet the original intent was to have a non-optical technology so that writing on the cheque, like signatures, would not interfere with reading. The main magnetic fonts (E13-B and CMC7) are downloadable for a small fee and in addition magnetic toner is available for many printers. Some higher resolution toners have sufficient magnetic properties for magnetic reading to be successful without special toner.

=== Phosphorescent dyes ===
Phosphorescence may accompany fluorescence and shows an after-glow when the UV light is switched off.

=== Anti-copying marks ===
In the late twentieth century advances in computer and photocopy technology made it possible for people without sophisticated training to easily copy currency. In an attempt to prevent this, banks have sought to add filtering features to the software and hardware available to the public that senses features of currency, and then locks out the reproduction of any material with these marks. One known example of such a system is the EURion constellation.

Banknotes with anti-copying marks

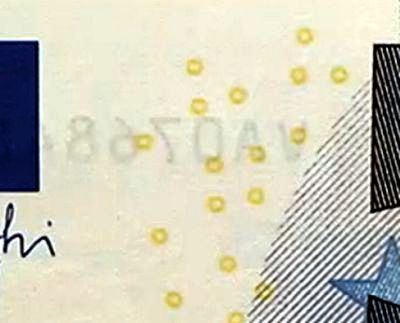
Obverse (cutout) of 5 euro (series ES2)

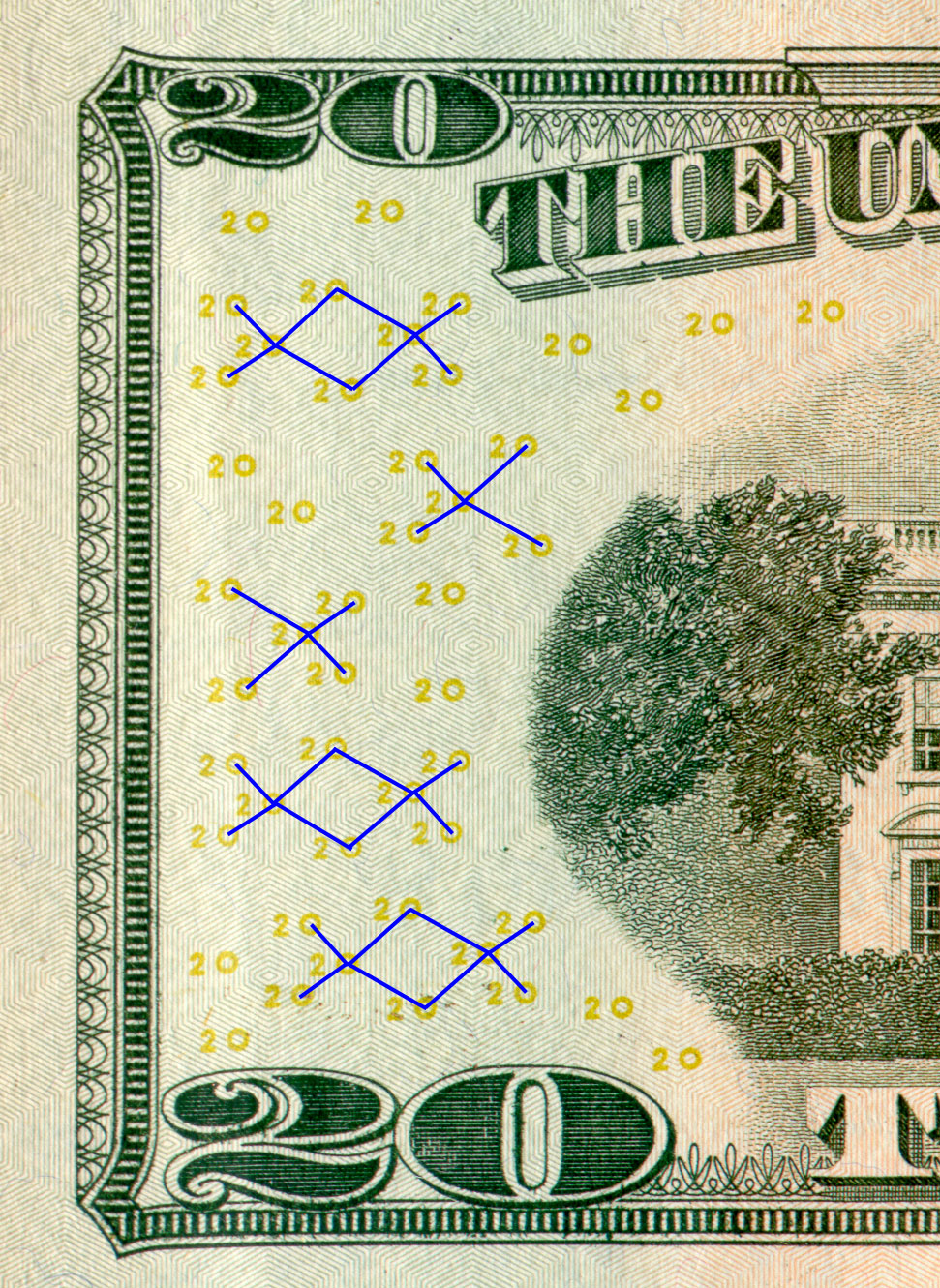
Obverse (cutout) of 20 US dollar (as part of the value numeral 20)

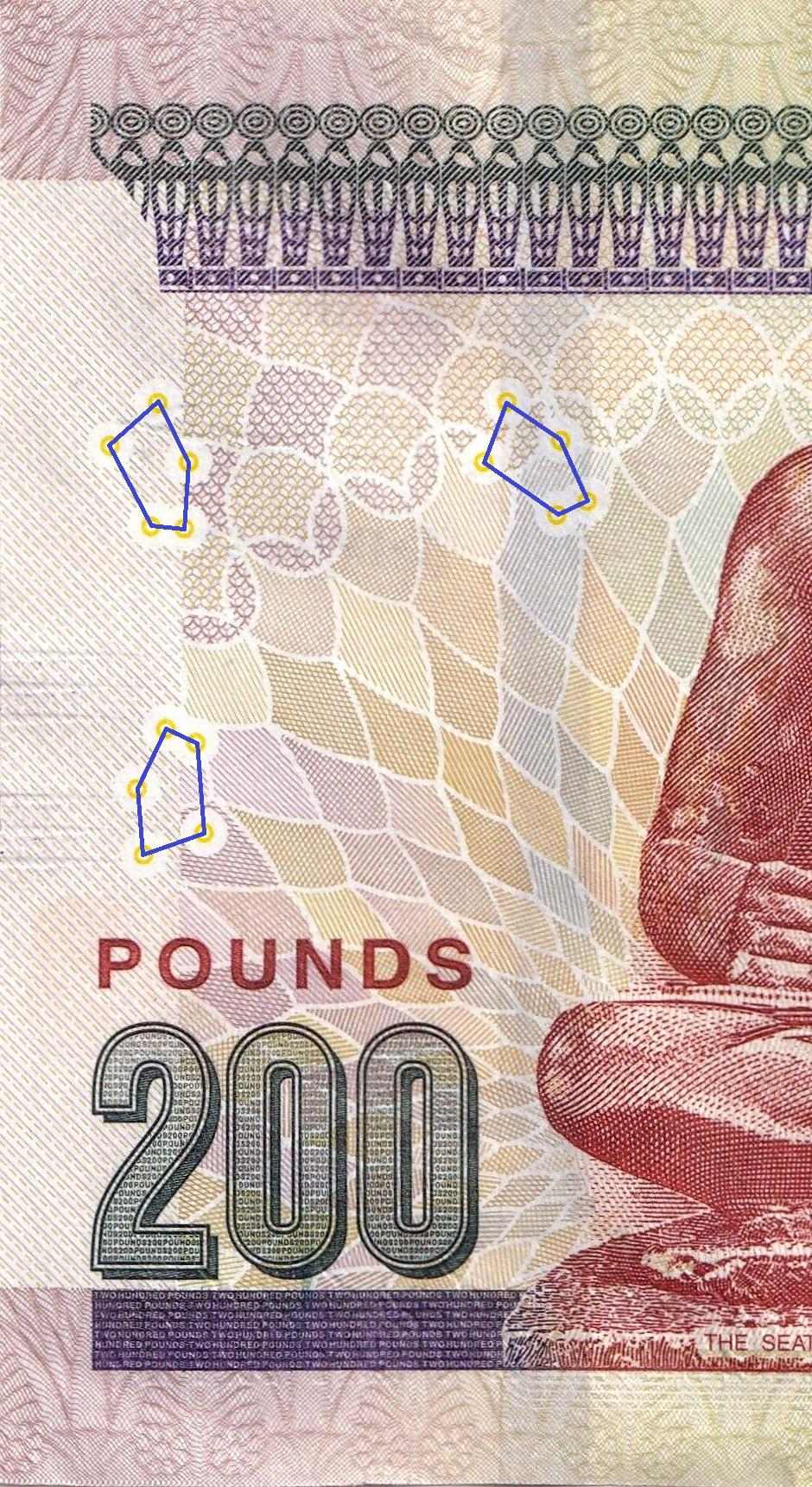
Reverse (cutout) of Egyptian 200 pound

=== Electronic devices ===
With the advent of Radio Frequency Identification (RFID) which is based on smart card technology, it is possible to insert extremely small RF-active devices into the printed product to enhance document security. This is most apparent in modern biometric passports, where an RFID chip mirrors the printed information. Biometric passports additionally include data for the verification of an individual's fingerprint or face recognition at automated border control gates.

=== Copy detection pattern and digital watermark ===
A copy detection pattern or a digital watermark can be inserted into a digital image before printing the security document. These security features are designed to be copy-sensitive and authenticated with an imaging device.

=== Level 3 features ===
Most central banks also implement so-called Level 3 (L3) security features which are kept totally secret for their ingredients as well as their sophisticated measurement. Such covert features may be embedded within the substrate and/or the printing ink and are not commercially available. They are the ultimate safeguard in banknote security and restricted to the use of central banks. The machine-readable M-Feature from Giesecke+Devrient is the worldwide leading L3 feature and currently used by more than 70 central banks with about 100 different compositions and more than 100 billion banknotes in circulation. Other products are ENIGMA from De La Rue and Level III Authentication from Spectra Systems.

== See also ==
- Authentication, particularly the subject product authentication
- Tamper-evident technology, particularly for money and stamps
- Tamper resistance, particularly the subject packaging
- Brand protection
- Security label
- Banknote processing, particularly how security features are detected
