= Void pantograph =

Document security method

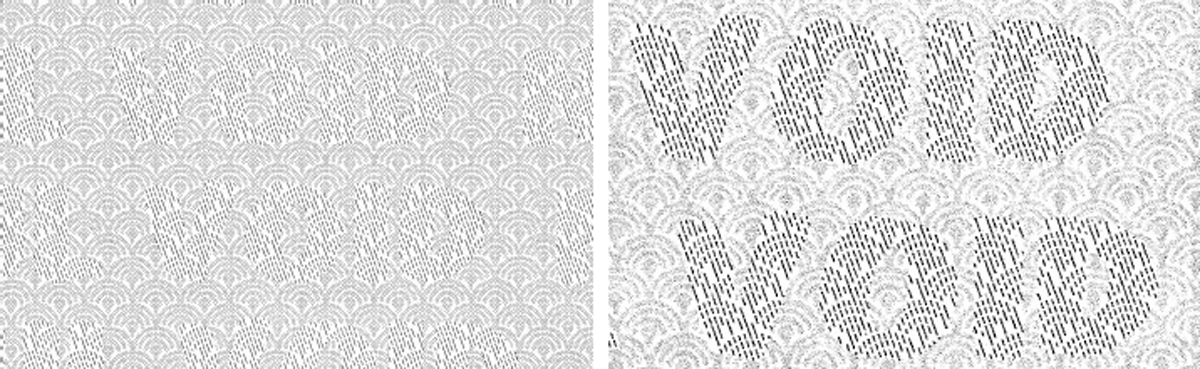
Example of a void pantograph pattern before (left) and after (right) the document has been photocopied.

In security printing, void pantograph refers to a method of making copy-evident and tamper-resistant patterns in the background of a document. Normally these are invisible to the eye, but become obvious when the document is photocopied. Typically they spell out "void", "copy", "invalid" or some other indicator message.

Void pantographs work by exploiting the limitations and features of copying equipment. A scanner or photocopier will act as a low-pass filter on the original image, blurring edges slightly. It will also not be perfectly aligned with the directions of the document, causing aliasing. Features smaller than the resolution will also not be reproduced. In addition, human vision is sensitive to luminance contrast ratio. This means that if a grey region consists of a grid of very small dark dots the filtering will produce a lighter grey, while a region of larger dots will be affected differently ("big-dot-little-dot"). This makes it possible to see a pattern that had been invisible. Numerous variations exist, including printing the marks using a raster of lines in one direction on a background of lines in another direction, or using fine line patterns that alias into a visible moire pattern when copied.
