= Copy detection pattern =

Counterfeit detection

A copy detection pattern (CDP) or graphical code is a small random or pseudo-random digital image which is printed on documents, labels or products for counterfeit detection. Authentication is made by scanning the printed CDP using an image scanner or mobile phone camera. It is possible to store additional product-specific data into the CDP that will be decoded during the scanning process. A CDP can also be inserted into a 2D barcode to facilitate smartphone authentication and to connect with traceability data.

== Principle ==
The detection of counterfeits using a CDP relies on an "information loss principle", which states that every time a digital image is printed or scanned, some information about the original digital image is lost. A CDP is a maximum entropy image that attempts to take advantage of this information loss. Since producing a counterfeit CDP requires an additional scanning and printing processes, it will have less information than an original CDP. By measuring the information in the scanned CDP, the detector can determine whether the CDP is an original print or a copy.

CDPs aim to address limitations of optical security features such as security holograms. They are motivated by the need for security features that can be originated, managed and transferred digitally, and that are machine readable. Contrarily to many traditional security printing techniques, CDPs do not rely on Security by Obscurity, as the algorithm for generating CDPs can be public as long as the key used to generate it or the digital CDP is not revealed.

CDPs have also been described as a type of optical physical unclonable function. While they have been cited as a "powerful tool to detect copies", it is noted however that CDPs "require an extensive knowledge of printing technologies" because the printing process introduces variation that is foundational to copy detection.

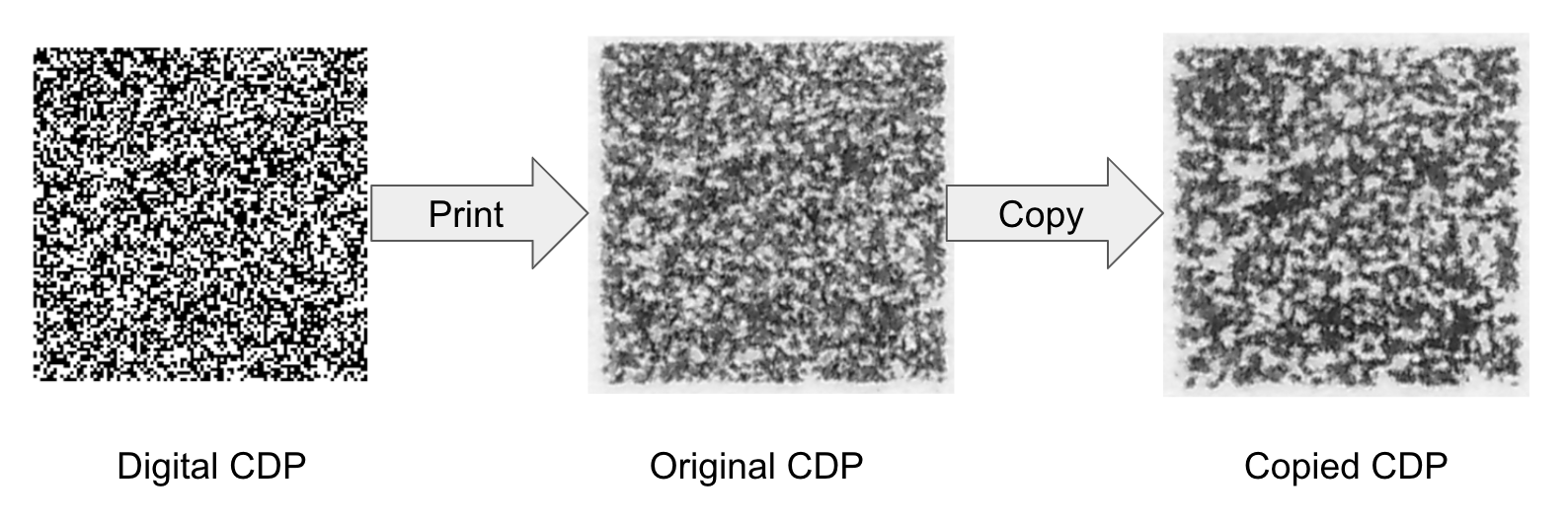
A digital CDP (100x100 pixel binary image) is printed at 600 pixels per inch (ppi) on a Canon C6045 laser printer. The original CDP real image size is 4.2mm x 4.2mm. This original CDP was scanned at 2400 ppi with a CanoScan 9000F flatbed scanner. The scan was processed with GIMP for image restoration, then printed on the same Canon C6045 laser printer. The copied CDP real image size is also 4.2mm x 4.2mm. Comparison of the original and copied CDP reveals a loss of details in the latter.

== Security assessment ==
The theoretical and practical assessment of the security level of CDPs, in other words the detector's ability to detect counterfeit attempts, is an ongoing area of research:

- In, practical recommendations on printing stability, taking into account scanning quality of the detector, and managing the security of printing facilities.
- In, a decision theoretic-model is developed to determine optimality properties of CDPs in idealised conditions. Based on an additive Gaussian noise assumption for the print channel and an attacker who takes optimal decisions, it is shown that the most effective decision function is a correlation function.
- In, different new CDP detection metrics are proposed and confirmed a significant improvement of copy detection accuracy.
- In, the impact of multiple printed observations of the same CDP is studied, and it is shown that the noise due to the printing process can be reduced but not completely removed, due to deterministic printing artefacts.
- In, a theoretical comparison is made between the performance of CDPs and natural randomness.
- In and, deep learning methods are used to recover portions of the digital CDP, and it is shown that these can be used to launch clonability attacks.
- In, quality control challenges are reviewed, and an inline verification system of secure graphics is proposed for high security printing applications.
- In, different attack methods based on restoration of the scanned CDP are tested. and show that a classifier based on support vector domain description outperforms other classification methods.

== Applications ==
CDPs are used for different physical item authentication applications:

- As a means of providing a product authentication service using the Internet of Things.
- For securing identification documents, in combination with digital watermarks and 2D barcodes. They were used in 2006 to protect identification badges during the FIFA World Cup.
- Integrated into QR Codes to enable consumers to check product authenticity with a smartphone application.
- For authenticating pharmaceutical packaging.

== Related techniques ==
The EURion constellation and digital watermarks are inserted into banknotes to be detected by scanners, photocopiers and image processing software. However the objective of these techniques is not to detect whether a given banknote is a counterfeit, but to deter amateur counterfeiters from reproducing banknotes by blocking the device or software used to make the counterfeit.

Digital watermarks may be used as well to differentiate original prints from counterfeits. A digital watermark may also be inserted into a 2D barcode. The fundamental difference between digital watermarks and CDPs is that a digital watermark must be embedded into an existing image while respecting a fidelity constraint, while the CDP does not have such constraint.
