= Banknotes of the Ukrainian hryvnia =

The National Bank of Ukraine has issued four banknote series since 1996. All banknotes in denominations of ₴20, ₴50, ₴100, ₴200, ₴500, ₴1,000 and ₴2,000 issued after 2003 (of the third and fourth series) are considered legal tender. All of them depict an important person in Ukraine's history on the obverse and a landmark place on the reverse. The ₴1, ₴2, ₴5, ₴10 denominations are no longer being considered legal tender and are intended to be gradually substituted by coins, though they remain common. There have been four commemorative banknote issues.

== History ==
In Ukraine's history, banknotes denominated in Ukrainian hryvnias (Ukrainian: гривня; ISO 4217 code: UAH, symbol: ₴) have been issued during two periods. The first of them took place in 1918 and 1919, when the Central Council of Ukraine decided to transition to hryvnia from karbovanets (карбованець), another currency that circulated in various periods of the country's history. In practice, the currencies were interchangeable. It became obsolete as the army of the Ukrainian People's Republic lost control over its claimed territory as a result of the defeat in the Ukrainian War of Independence.

This article covers all hryvnia banknotes issued, or planned to be issued, by government authorities as well as some local issues. Shah (шаг) stamps as subdivisions of hryvnia and interest coupons denominated in hryvnias and shahs are covered here because they were also printed on paper.

The second period when Ukrainian hryvnia banknotes appeared was in the times of post-Soviet independence. In 1991–1996, karbovanets (Note: The Soviet ruble was also known in Ukrainian as karbovanets) was circulating in newly independent Ukraine, but the currency experienced hyperinflation. The first post-independence hryvnia banknotes were printed in Canada and Malta in 1992. In September 1996, they entered circulation, following their replacement by hryvnia at a rate of 100,000:1. All issues of hryvnia banknotes that have been printed in 1994 and later were made in Ukraine.

Notes issued in Ukraine, including hryvnia notes, can be viewed at the Museum of Money of the National Bank of Ukraine in Kyiv.

=== Ukrainian War of Independence ===
During the later half of 1917, the Central Council of Ukraine sought to gain more autonomy from the Russian Republic, which was ultimately asserted at the Third Universal, establishing the Ukrainian People's Republic (UNR). With the creation of a new state entity, the country's need for its own currency became urgent. In December 1917, the UNR introduced karbovanets as a stopgap measure, until the law of 1 March 1918 installed hryvnia as official currency. The exchange rate was 2 hryvnias to 1 karbovanets issued in 1917. It was defined by law to be convertible to gold at a rate of 1 hryvnia = 8.712 dolya (0.3833 grams, or about 0.012324 oz t). The hryvnia was subdivided into 100 shah.

Since karbovanets currency was circulating at par with the Russian ruble/Soviet ruble until late 1918, it could not be worth more than them, and the rubles were rapidly depreciating. Legislative efforts to limit or outright ban the usage of Russian currencies in Ukraine had limited success. Aggravating the situation was a lack of gold reserves. This meant that the hryvnia was also losing value very quickly. Even though Ukrainian currency was spared from the worst of the hyperinflation, maintaining the gold standard proved unfeasible.

=== 1918 ===
==== State Credit Notes ====
The law of 1 March 1918 envisaged printing denominations of 2, 5, 10, 20, 50, 100, 500 and 1000 hryvnias, which officially called State Credit Notes (Державний кредитовий білет). On 24 March 1918, the UNR signed an agreement to print banknotes via the Reichsdruckerei, the German state banknote printer. (Note: As Martos and Zozulya note, at the time when the banknotes were ordered, there was no suitable equipment to print the money in Ukraine.) There were some problems with the contractor. Despite ordering 16,000,000 5-hryvnia notes and 9,000,000 20-hryvnia notes, these were not printed. 50-hryvnia notes were not contracted at all.

All of the submitted designs of Ukrainian hryvnia banknotes were tampered with in Germany, changing colours without the permission of designers or the government. Heorhiy Narbut, who drew the design of the 500-hryvnia note, lamented their poor quality. The Ukrainian State decided to forego 5-hryvnia and 20-hryvnia bills in favour of a new denomination of 2,000 hryvnia, which the Ukrainian government was formally not authorised to issue.

All banknotes contain the following text on the reverse: "State Credit Notes of the Ukrainian People's Republic are guaranteed by all state property of the Republic. ~ State Credit Notes of the Ukrainian People's Republic circulate alongside golden coinage. ~ Counterfeiting of State Credit Notes is punished by disfranchisement and prison", as mandated by law (later referred to as "State Credit Note notice"). The gold standard notice was also printed, which read: "(One) hryvnia contains 8.712 dolya of pure gold" ((Одна) гривня містить 8,712 долі щирого золота). All banknotes had anti-counterfeiting protections, such as a watermark and guilloche pattern.

Image		Value	Dimensions (mm)	Main colour	Description			Date of			Issued value (quantity ordered)
Obverse	Reverse	Value	Dimensions (mm)	Main colour	Obverse	Reverse	Designer	order	issue	lapse	Issued value (quantity ordered)
		2 hryvni	108 × 70	Green, blue	Denomination, tryzub, name of state ("УКРАЇНСЬКА НАРОДНЯ РЕСПУБЛІКА"). Centre: Gold standard notice and karbovanets exchange notice ("Дві гривні рівні 1 карбованцю") arranged in a tree-like pattern.	Denomination and decorative pattern; State Credit Note notice inside a rhombus-like shape	Vasyl Krychevsky	24 March 1918	September or October 1918	1920	>5,5 million hryvnias (ordered 15 million banknotes)
		10 hryven'	139 × 89	Red	Denomination, tryzub inside a plant ornament, name of state ("УКРАЇНСЬКА НАРОДНЯ РЕСПУБЛІКА"). Gold standard notice at the banknote's bottom	Denomination, name of state and State Credit Note notice in a blank rectangle; all inside a decorative frame.	Heorhiy Narbut	24 March 1918	September or October 1918	1920	? (ordered 12 million banknotes)
		100 hryven'	175 × 115	Blue and violet (Note: Grey and violet banknotes of this denomination also appear, but they are very rare)	Denomination (in numbers), name of state ("УКРАЇНСЬКА НАРОДНЯ РЕСПУБЛІКА"). Figures of two peasants (woman to the left, man to the right); between them a wreath, inside which a tryzub and denomination (in words) are located; gold standard notice at the bottom.	A rich plant ornament with tryzub in the middle, extending between two Greek columns; State Credit Note notice in a blue rectangle and abbreviation of the state's name (У.Н.Р.) at the bottom.	Heorhiy Narbut	24 March 1918	September or October 1918	1920	427,989,300 hryvnias (ordered 3.5 million banknotes)
		500 hryven'	185 × 119	Blue, orange	Name of state ("УКРАЇНСЬКА НАРОДНЯ РЕСПУБЛІКА") at the top. A woman's head with a wreath on her head (personification of Ukraine), with radially extending rays; tryzub inside a plant ornament on either side of the banknote; gold standard notice	A large tryzub with text of the State Credit Note notice overlaid over it; four more tryzubs in each corner of the banknote; denomination spelt twice on each side of the banknote.	Heorhiy Narbut	24 March 1918	September or October 1918	1920	1,683,500 hryvnias (ordered 340,000 banknotes)
		1,000 hryven'	196 × 125	Bright orange, blue	Name of state ("УКРАЇНСЬКА ДЕРЖАВА") at the top; denomination spelt in words and numbers; tryzub in the background; all surrounded by a frame with triglyphs	Denomination in large characters; State Credit Note notice and gold standard notice to its left; all surrounded by decorative frame, with "1000" interspersed in it.	Ivan Mozalevskyi	After 29 April 1918	17 October 1918	1920	? (ordered 70,000 banknotes)
		2,000 hryven'	204 × 134	Red, green	Name of state ("УКРАЇНСЬКА ДЕРЖАВА") at the top; denomination spelt in words and numbers; tryzub in the background; all surrounded by a decorative frame	Denomination in large characters; State Credit Note notice and gold standard notice to the bottom; all surrounded by decorative frame	Ivan Mozalevskyi	After 29 April 1918	17 October 1918	1920	?
These images are to scale at 0.7 pixel per millimetre (18 pixel per inch). For table standards, see the banknote specification table.

==== State Treasury Notes ====
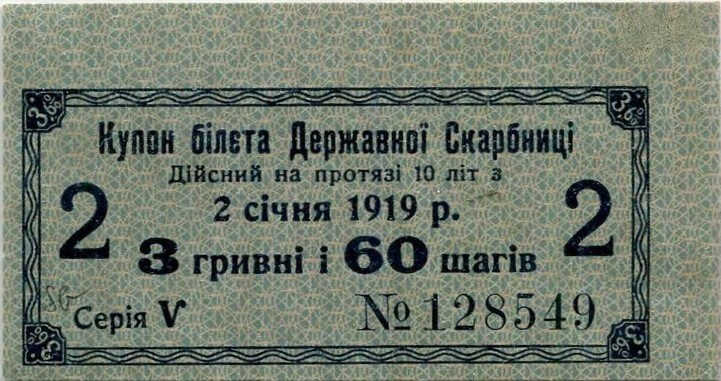
A close-up view of a 3.6% interest coupon (here denominated at 3.60 hryvnias)

On 30 March 1918, the Central Council of Ukraine approved a release of 100 million karbovanets worth of State Treasury Notes (білєт Державної Скарбниці). The sum was increased to 500 million karbovanets on 12 May, which was doubled on 9 July 1918. Yakiv Zozulya attributes such rapid increases to a seemingly clientelist agreement with Austria-Hungary and German Empire, whereby Ukraine granted a 200 million karbovanets "unlimited-term loan" to each of these countries. On the other hand, Pavlo Hay-Nyzhnyk said the money was needed to revive the country's economy anyway.

In essence, State Treasury Notes were 4-year treasury bonds issued in denominations of 50, 100, 200 and 1,000 hryvnias. They yielded 3.6% simple interest per annum paid every six months, on 1 July and 2 January. They had a unified design prepared by Heorhiy Narbut, with a roughly square centre, where the value of the bond was written, plus four coupons on either side of the note, worth respectively 0.90, 1.80, 3.60 and 18 hryvnias each. The only feature that was different between each of these bonds was colours. Due to the enormous size of the notes, as well as due to the location of coupons, they were nicknamed "airplanes" (аероплани).

The coupons and the notes were not formally intended to be legal tender in the sense that the possibility to redeem them at banks was limited by the dates in coupons. In practice, due to an acute shortage of small change, these pieces of paper were readily cut out and circulated as plain currency. Even government agencies accepted both the notes and the coupons for payments. The coupons and the State Treasury Notes were thus described as "surrogate banknotes".

Image		Value (note)	Value (coupon)	Dimensions (mm)	Colour		Description		Date of		
Obverse	Reverse	Value (note)	Value (coupon)	Dimensions (mm)	Paper	Ink	Obverse	Reverse	order	issue	lapse
		50 hryven'	90 shahiv (0.90 hryvnia)	294 × 150 (full); 150 × 150 (note without coupons); 75 × 37 (coupons)	Greenish	Red, violet	Centre: Inside the frame containing an intricate plant ornament with numbers corresponding to denomination on its left and right sides, a tryzub on the top side and an inscription "БІЛЕТ ДІЙСНИЙ ПО 1 СІЧНЯ 1933 р." (Note: Due to a printing error, до (until) was printed as по (after). They were intended to be voided on 1 January 1933.) on the bottom side, the note's denomination spelled in letters, the type of note, signatures and serial numbers. Coupons: Inside a frame, inscriptions: "Купон білєта Державної Скарбниці", "дійсний на протязі 10 літ з", the date (from 1 July 1918 up to 2 January 1922, with semiannual intervals), the number noting the order when coupons become mature, and the respective denomination of the coupon	Inside a frame with denomination in numbers spelled at its corners, text of the 1918 Directive on the State Treasury Notes. Denominations printed at the place of coupons.	30 March 1918	5 August 1918	1920 (Note: The State Treasury Notes were supposed to be redeemed by 1933, but were rendered obsolete by 1920)
		100 hryven'	1.80 hryvnia	294 × 150 (full); 150 × 150 (note without coupons); 75 × 37 (coupons)	Orange	Blue, green		Inside a frame with denomination in numbers spelled at its corners, text of the 1918 Directive on the State Treasury Notes. Denominations printed at the place of coupons.	30 March 1918	5 August 1918	1920
		200 hryven'	3.60 hryvnia	294 × 150 (full); 150 × 150 (note without coupons); 75 × 37 (coupons)	Turqoise	Orange		Inside a frame with denomination in numbers spelled at its corners, text of the 1918 Directive on the State Treasury Notes. Denominations printed at the place of coupons.	30 March 1918	5 August 1918	1920
		1000 hryven'	18 hryvnias	294 × 150 (full); 150 × 150 (note without coupons); 75 × 37 (coupons)	Ochre	Pink		Inside a frame with denomination in numbers spelled at its corners, text of the 1918 Directive on the State Treasury Notes. Denominations printed at the place of coupons.	30 March 1918	5 August 1918	1920
These images are to scale at 0.7 pixel per millimetre (18 pixel per inch). For table standards, see the banknote specification table.

==== Shahivky fractional currency ====
Shahivky (шагівки) were named so after shah, the subdivision of hryvnia, and served as small change because of the strong deficit of metals to mint coins. On 18 April 1918, the government authorised to issue paper "coins" of 1, 2, 4, 6, 10, 20, 30, 40 and 50 shahiv. The first four denominations have never been issued, nor are they known to have ever been printed. According to various estimates, the other five shahivky accounted for about 24-38 million hryvnia in circulation. Among those issued, the 30 shahiv stamp was rarer than the other denominations.

Shahivky were postage stamp-sized, and they were sometimes used as postage stamps due to the dearth of "real" postage stamps. Unlike the postage staps, which were all imperforate, the five pieces of postage stamp currencies were usually Perf. 11 ½ stamps. 40 and 50 shahiv imperforate stamps are known to exist but are much rarer than the perforated versions. The currency was printed on thicker paper than the stamps, and the notice saying that the post stamps "circulate alongside metal coinage" appeared on the reverse, unlike in stamps, where the other side was blank. Due to their weak protections, shahivky were often counterfeited, particularly the top two denominations.

Due to their lightness and their propensity to be blown away by the wind, they earned a tongue-in-cheek nickname of "butterflies" (метелики). They were also known as "postage stamps" (марки) in reference to their size and appearance. The shops of the time were known to give out change in bundles of hundreds of such stamp "coins".

Image		Value	Dimensions (mm)	Main colour	Description			Date of		
Obverse	Reverse	Value	Dimensions (mm)	Main colour	Obverse	Reverse	Designer	first printing	issue	lapse
		10 shahiv	30 × 25	Light brown	Inside flower ornaments, a big tryzub illuminated by the sun. The base of the tryzub touches the outline of Ukrainian borders as shown on the globe. Name of state above the composition, denomination below it	Inside a single- or double-striped frame, a tryzub, under which a notice reading: "Ходить нарівні з дзвінкою монетою".	Anton Sereda	17 April 1918	8 or 18 July 1918	1920
		20 shahiv	30 × 25	Dark brown	Inside an oval, a peasant with a scythe looking at tryzub. Name of the state above the peasant, denomination below him	Inside a single- or double-striped frame, a tryzub, under which a notice reading: "Ходить нарівні з дзвінкою монетою".	Anton Sereda	17 April 1918	8 or 18 July 1918	1920
		30 shahiv	30 × 25	Ultramarineor grey-violet (rare)	Head of a young woman with a wreath (identical to 500 hryvnia banknote, see above) inside an octagon. Two stylised tryzub figures at the top corners and post horns at the bottom. Denomination at the very top; name of state at the bottom.	Inside a single- or double-striped frame, a tryzub, under which a notice reading: "Ходить нарівні з дзвінкою монетою".	Heorhiy Narbut	17 April 1918	8 or 18 July 1918	1920
		40 shahiv	30 × 25	Green	A big tryzub surrounded by a wreath. Name of the state at the top of the shahivka, denomination and post horns below	Inside a single- or double-striped frame, a tryzub, under which a notice reading: "Ходить нарівні з дзвінкою монетою".	Heorhiy Narbut	17 April 1918	8 or 18 July 1918	1920
		50 shahiv	30 × 25	Red	Inside a wreath, denomination in large characters. Post horns above the denomination, name of state at the very bottom of the stamp.	Inside a single- or double-striped frame, a tryzub, under which a notice reading: "Ходить нарівні з дзвінкою монетою".	Heorhiy Narbut	17 April 1918	8 or 18 July 1918	1920
These images are to scale at 2.5 pixels per millimetre. For table standards, see the banknote specification table.

=== Directorate ===
In 1918, the Ukrainian State fell and the name returned to the Ukrainian People's Republic, represented by the Directorate. The new government declared hryvnias to be the "national currency" and tried to de-emphasize the other parallel Ukrainian currency, the karbovanets. However, many more denominations were issued in karbovanets than in hryvnia in 1919. The government only managed to issue a so-called State Treasury Exchange Note (Розмінний знак Державної Скарбниці) worth 5 hryvnias with a hastily-prepared primitive design. It was printed in Stanislaviv (now Ivano-Frankivsk) and became the only state-sanctioned banknote ever printed on the territory of West Ukrainian People's Republic (ZUNR). The banknotes were mostly circulated in Eastern Galicia.

In 1920, the circulation of the Ukrainian currency was curtailed. In January, the Communists, who controlled most of Ukraine, ordered the banks to stop accepting all money issued by previous Ukrainian governments, including hryvnias, and removed the obligation to accept Ukrainian currency by private parties. At the end of 1920, they forbade circulation of all Ukrainian money. The last known issue of Ukrainian currency in 1917–1920 were State Credit Notes, denominated at 50 and 1,000 hryvnias, which were printed in Vienna. Few proofs (German: Muster) of these banknotes are known to exist. They became obsolete before they could be circulated, as Symon Petliura dissolved the Directorate's government in November 1920 because it barely controlled any territory.

Image		Value	Dimensions (mm)	Main colour	Description			Date of	
Obverse	Reverse	Value	Dimensions (mm)	Main colour	Obverse	Reverse	Designer	issue	lapse
		5 hryven'	98 × 58 or 100 × 60	Black-and-white	Inside a frame composed of small circles, a big tryzub to the left side, separated by a thin line from the rest of the banknote. On the right side, text: "РОЗМІННИЙ ЗНАК / ДЕРЖАВНОЇ СКАРБНИЦІ / У.Н.Р.", denomination and handwritten signature	On the right side, legal notice concerning the banknote, denomination to the left; symbol of the Ukrainian People's Republic and seal of the Ukrainian State both appear A version with an error ("ПЯТЬ ГИВЕНЬ") also exists.	Mix of three designs	July 1919	1920
		50 hryven'	116 × 57	Green and blue	Baroque-styled architectural and plant decorations, in which the year of printing and tryzub appear. A female and a male peasant sitting on top of the decorations, inside which the type of note, denomination and signatures appear	Portrait of Petro Doroshenko (1627 – 1698), Hetman of Right-bank Ukraine (1665 – 1672) inside a richly decorated frame to the left side. To the right side, denomination with a big blue "50", above which the country of issue is spelled out. Bottom contains legal notices (gold standard and a shortened State Credit Note notice).	Heorhiy Narbut	not issued (printed 1920)	
		1,000 hryven'	168 × 84	Blue and orange	To the top, figures of Cossacks; to the left, stylised letters У.Н.Р. and tryzub in orange ink, surrounded by a Baroque-styled architectural frame with sunflowers; type of note, denomination and signatures at the bottom right	Portrait of Bohdan Khmelnytsky, inside a window of a Baroque-like decoration; in two adjacent windows, tryzubs and stylised acronyms "УНР". The decoration itself is between two swaths of wheat; in the empty area to the left, another printed tryzub. Denomination and country of issue at the top. Gold standard and a shortened State Credit Note notice printed in two other fields with denominations.	Heorhiy Narbut	not issued (printed 1920)	
These images are to scale at 0.7 pixel per millimetre (18 pixel per inch). For table standards, see the banknote specification table.

=== Local issues ===
Apart from state-issued banknotes, there were also hundreds of local currency paper currency units, notes, coupons etc., issued by municipal authorities. Over 300 municipalities within current Ukrainian borders once issued a total of over 1,500 variously named currency substitutes, mostly rubles, karbovanets and hryvnia. Some of the paper currency denominated in hryvnia is shown in the gallery below.

Local hryvnia issues from 1919

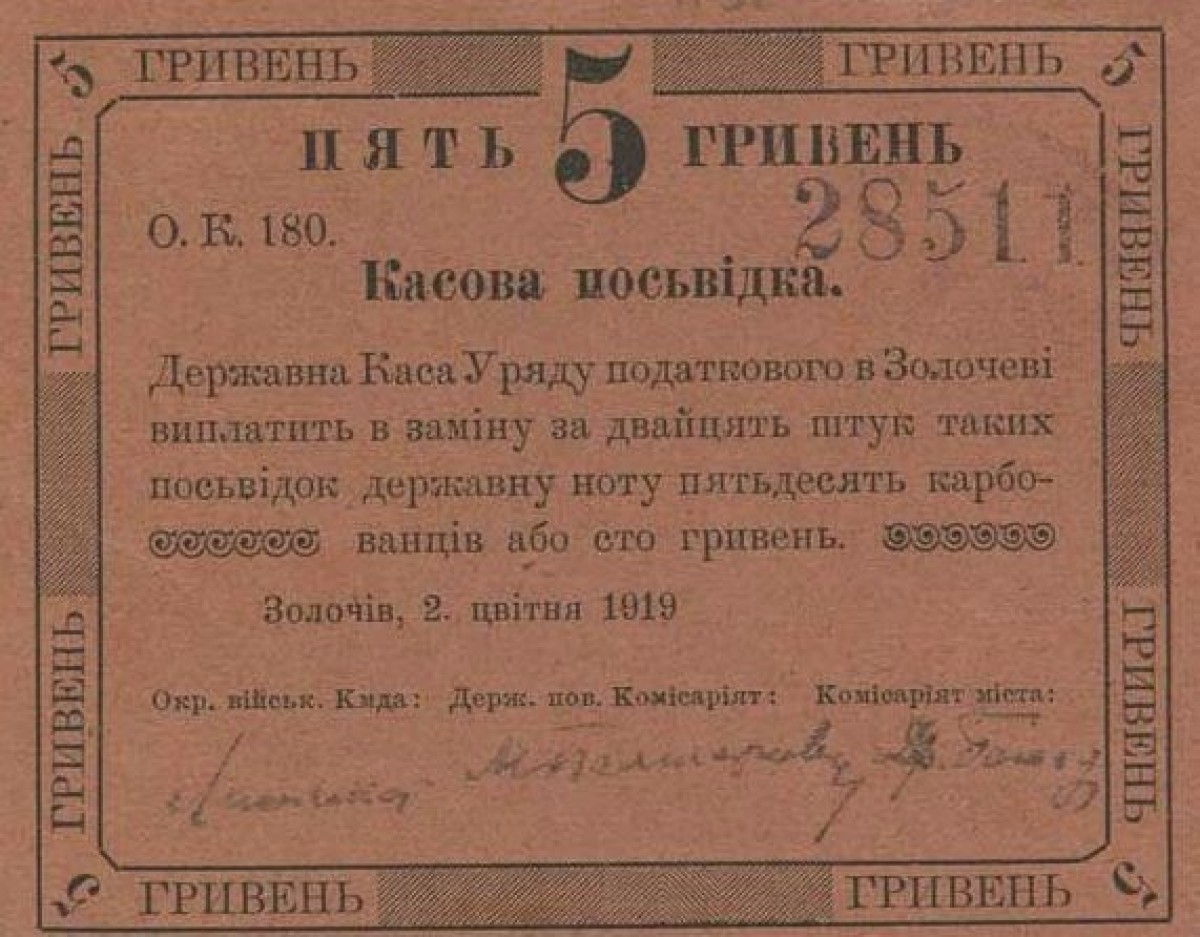
5 hryvnia "cashier's certificate" printed in Zolochiv

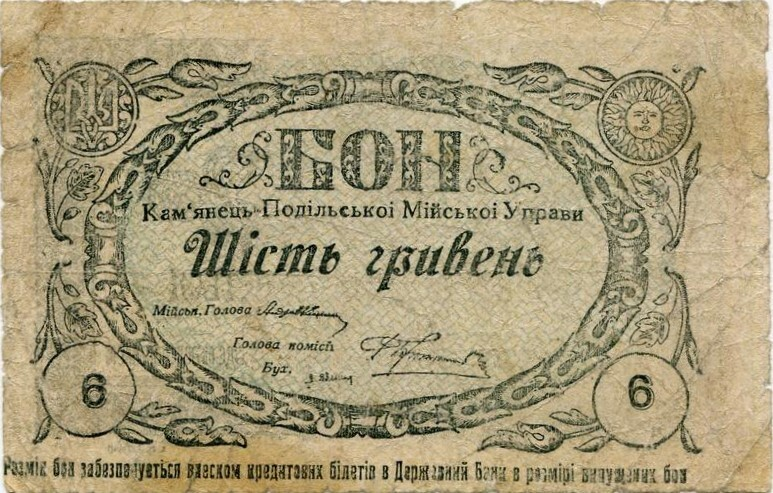
6 hryvnias printed in Kamyanets-Podilskyi

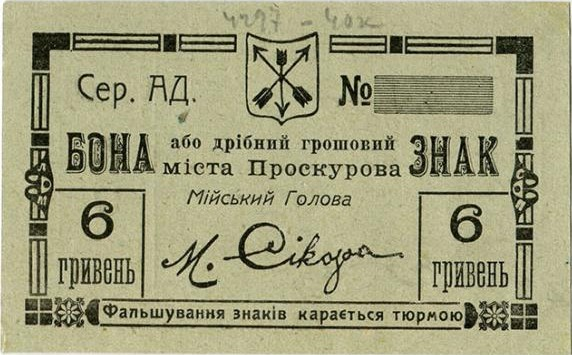
6 hryvnias printed in Proskuriv (now Khmelnytskyi). (Note: Proskuriv was among the few cities denominating hryvnia banknotes also in karbovanets)

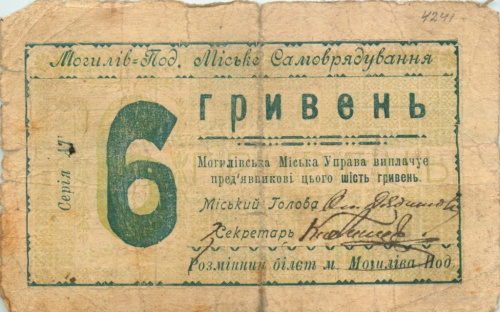
Mohyliv-Podilskyi 6 hryvnia note

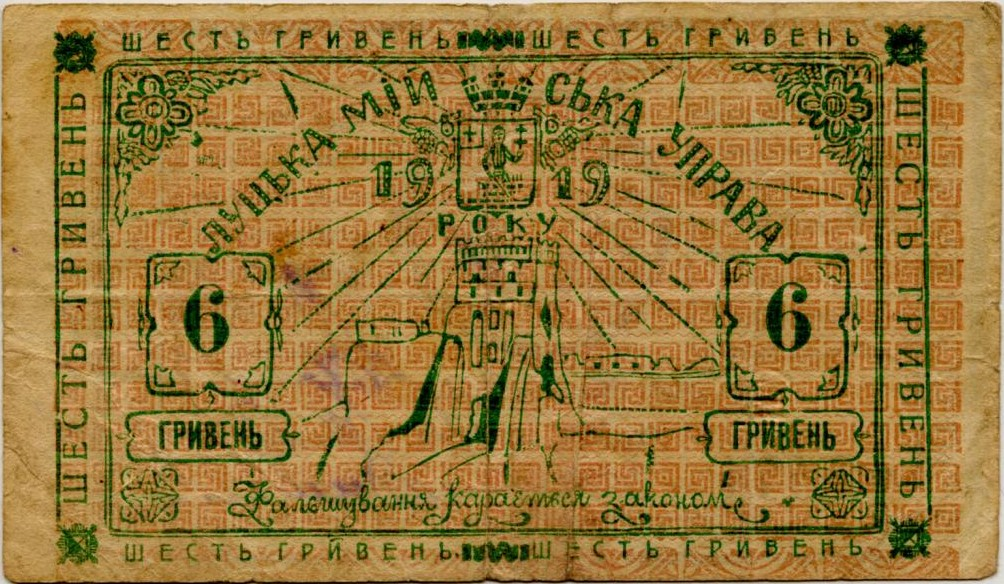
6 hryvnias issued in Lutsk

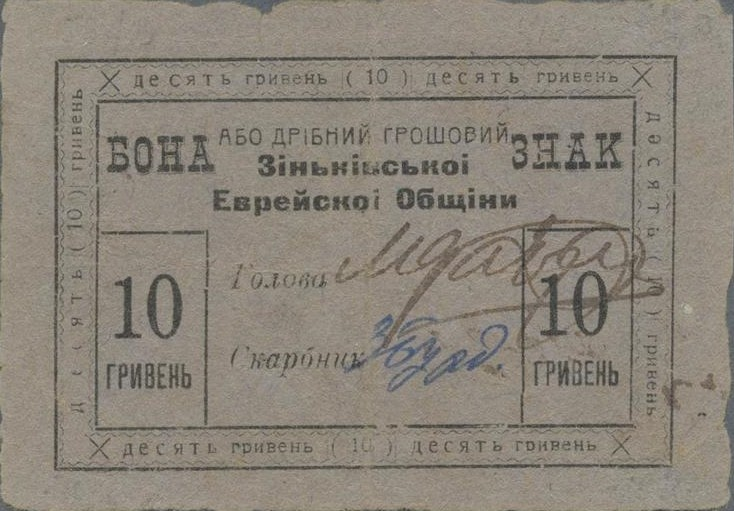
Zinkiv Jewish community 10-hryvnia note

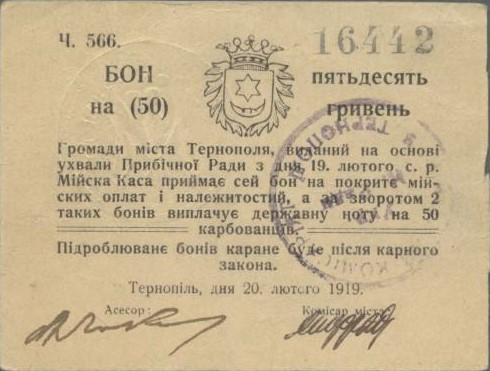
50-hryvnia note in Ternopil

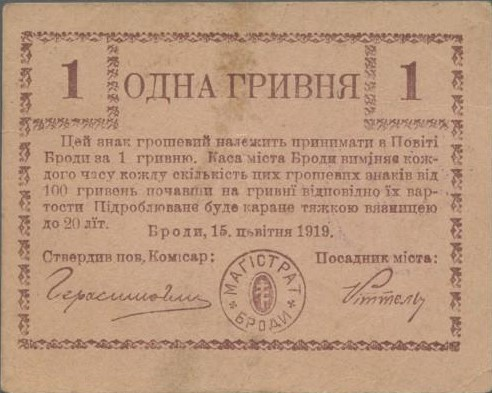
Brody 1-hryvnia note

== Post-Soviet Ukraine ==
=== History ===
As Ukraine was nearing independence in 1991, the government of then Ukrainian SSR began preparations to introduce a new currency named hryvnia. (Note: Initially, the Communist MPs proposed to stick with karbovanets, which coincidentially was the official name of the Soviet ruble in Ukrainian, and one MP even suggested to introduce Ukrainian dollars, but the name hryvnia stuck.) In April 1991, Leonid Kravchuk, then leader of the Supreme Soviet of Ukrainian SSR, ordered the preparation of designs for the new national currency. It was initially planned to issue banknotes in denominations of ₴1, ₴3, ₴5, ₴10, ₴25, ₴50, ₴100 and ₴200, mimicking the denominations of the Soviet ruble. The decision for the design of the currencies was adopted on 11 September 1991. On that day, it was decided to change a planned ₴3 note to ₴2, and ₴25 notes to ₴20, as well as to set aside ₴200 as a reserve denomination.

It was then that the general outline of banknotes was chosen, with a prominent person from Ukraine's history on the obverse and a landmark building on the reverse, in most cases directly related to the person displayed. The choice of the people portrayed met with some reservations. Kravchuk feared that inclusion of hetman Ivan Mazepa might incense Moscow, as Russians see him as a traitor. The candidacy of historian Mykhailo Hrushevskyi was also politically sensitive, but it was approved and stayed in banknote designs.

The first series was developed by Ukrainian artists Vasyl Lopata and Borys Maksymov, who used relatively uncommon depictions of Taras Shevchenko and the Kievan Rus' rulers. Lopata was drawing the portraits and the buildings, while Maksymov designed the rest of the banknote. Lopata proposed his versions of 500 and 1,000 hryvnias, with Hryhorii Skovoroda or Daniel of Galicia on the former denomination and Petro Mohyla on the latter, but his idea was not supported.

As the preparations for the first series were made, it became apparent that Ukraine lacked appropriate domestic facilities to print banknotes. Therefore, banknotes of the first series of hryvnias were made by the Canadian Bank Note Company. 50, 100 and 200 hryvnias, which made part of the second series, after some problems connected with print quality and delays with the Canadian contractor, were eventually ordered from the Maltese branch of De La Rue, which was also producing karbovanets banknotes until the national banknote printing facility started operation in 1994. (Note: Another important piece of banknote production was the banknote paper factory, which started operation in 1997 in Malyn in Zhytomyr Oblast)

By the time the banknotes arrived, the economic crisis became so deep and inflation so bad that the government decided to stick with the karbovanets. It was only on 2 September 1996 that the first series of hryvnia banknotes, up to 20 hryvnias, was introduced into circulation by the National Bank of Ukraine (NBU).

In 1996, the 1, 50, and 100 hryvnia notes of the second series were introduced. The 1 hryvnia note was already produced in Ukraine in the brand new printing factory, as would all subsequent banknotes be, while the two higher denominations were still printed by De La Rue. They had better security features in comparison with the first series. Most of the other denominations went into circulation in 1997. The 200 hryvnia note was released in 2001, just before the tenth anniversary of Ukraine's independence.

The second series was quickly found to have several drawbacks, so plans to replace it were approved as early as 1999. Serhiy Tihipko, then governor of the National Bank of Ukraine, noted that 2, 10 and 20 hryvnias were hardly distinguishable from each other. Artists have pointed to several design flaws and inaccuracies in the banknotes. Lopata was, for instance, not happy with the De La Rue banknotes, and the National Bank of Ukraine wanted to introduce new security features. In 2003, the ₴20 note became the first banknote of the third series of the Ukrainian hryvnia. Other denominations quickly followed suit. It was also then that the ₴500 bills, which became among the most common banknotes in Ukraine, were introduced into circulation.

Refurbished versions of these banknotes, with even more anti-counterfeiting techniques, were released starting from 2014 (₴100), followed by ₴500 regular issue and a ₴20 commemorative note in 2016, ₴20 regular bill in 2018 and the rest of the banknotes, including the new ₴1000, in 2019 and early 2020.

All descriptions taken from the site of the National Bank of Ukraine.

==== First series ====
Image		Value	Dimensions (mm)	Main colour	Description		Date of			
Obverse	Reverse	Value	Dimensions (mm)	Main colour	Obverse	Reverse	first printing	issue	withdrawal	lapse
		₴1	135 × 70	Dark green	Volodymyr the Great (c. 958 – 1015) Prince of Novgorod and Grand Prince of Kiev Ruler of Kievan Rus' in 980–1015	Ruins of Chersonesos (now in Sevastopol)	1992	2 September 1996	1 October 2020	30 September 2023
		₴2	135 × 70	Terracotta	Yaroslav the Wise (c. 978 – 1054) Prince of Novgorod and Grand Prince of Kiev; Ruler of Kievan Rus' in 1019–1054	Saint Sophia Cathedral in Kyiv	1992	2 September 1996	1 October 2020	30 September 2023
		₴5	135 × 70	Dark blue	Bohdan Khmelnytsky (c. 1595 – 1657) Hetman of Ukrainian Cossacks (1648–1657)	St. Elijah Church in the village of Subotiv, Cherkasy Oblast	1992	2 September 1996	1 October 2020	30 September 2023
		₴10	135 × 70	Violet	Ivan Mazepa (1639 – 1709) Hetman of Ukrainian Cossacks (1687–1708), patron of the arts	Kyiv Pechersk Lavra	1992	2 September 1996	1 October 2020	30 September 2023
		₴20	135 × 70	Olive	Ivan Franko (1856 – 1916) Poet, writer and political activist	Lviv Opera and Ballet Theatre	1992	2 September 1996	1 October 2020	30 September 2023
		₴50	135 × 70	Red	Mykhailo Hrushevsky (1866 – 1934) Historian and politician; head of the Central Council of Ukraine (1917–1918)	The Central Council of Ukraine building (currently Teacher's House in Kyiv)	1992	Never released in circulation, but sold as souvenirs (as part of the 2016 commemorative series that included all the banknote types issued before then)		
		₴100	135 × 70	Green	Taras Shevchenko (1814 – 1861), according to Lopata's portrait Poet and artist; author of Kobzar	Building of the Verkhovna Rada (parliament)	1992	Never released in circulation, but sold as souvenirs (as part of the 2016 commemorative series that included all the banknote types issued before then)		
These images are to scale at 0.7 pixel per millimetre (18 pixel per inch). For table standards, see the banknote specification table.

==== Second series ====
Image		Value	Dimensions (mm)	Main colour	Description		Date of			
Obverse	Reverse	Value	Dimensions (mm)	Main colour	Obverse	Reverse	issue	printing	withdrawal	lapse
		₴1	133 × 66	Green and brown	Volodymyr the Great	Ruins of Chersonesos (now Sevastopol)	2 September 1996	1994, 1995	1 October 2020	30 September 2023
		₴2	133 × 66	Orange and Terracotta	Yaroslav the Wise	Saint Sophia Cathedral in Kyiv	1 September 1997	1995, 2001	1 October 2020	30 September 2023
		₴5	133 × 66	Blue	Bohdan Khmelnytsky	St. Elijah Church in the village of Subotiv, Cherkasy Oblast	1 September 1997	1994, 1997, 2001	1 October 2020	30 September 2023
		₴10	133 × 66	Bluish-grey (obverse) Pink, violet (reverse)	Ivan Mazepa	Kyiv Pechersk Lavra	1 September 1997	1994, 2000	1 October 2020	30 September 2023
		₴20	133 × 66	Brown, green	Ivan Franko	Lviv Opera and Ballet Theatre	1 September 1997	1995, 2000	1 October 2020	30 September 2023
		₴50	133 × 66	Yellow, violet	Mykhailo Hrushevsky	Building of the Verkhovna Rada (parliament)	2 September 1996	? (Note: Not indicated on banknotes; presumed 1992)	1 October 2020	30 September 2023
		₴100	133 × 66	Rose, green	Taras Shevchenko (1814 – 1861) according to an 1871 portrait by Ivan Kramskoi Poet and artist; author of Kobzar	Saint Sophia Cathedral in Kyiv	2 September 1996	?	1 October 2020	30 September 2023
		₴200	133 × 66	Blue, peach	Lesya Ukrainka (1871 – 1913) Poet and writer	Entrance tower of Lutsk Castle	22 August 2001	?	1 October 2020	30 September 2023
These images are to scale at 0.7 pixel per millimetre (18 pixel per inch). For table standards, see the banknote specification table.

=== Current banknotes ===
Since October 2020, all banknotes from the first and the second series were withdrawn from circulation and are only exchanged in banks. All banknotes of the third and fourth series remain legal tender. However, banknotes from ₴1 to ₴10, which have already been gradually withdrawn in favour of coins of the same denominations, will lose legal tender status on 2 March 2026. Other third-series banknotes are being replaced with the newest, fourth-series banknotes. The banknotes generally use cotton as a substrate, but the ₴1000 banknote includes 20% linen fibres. The usage of linen was pioneered in the ₴20 commemorative banknote issued in 2016.

As of 1 January 2026, there were almost 2.64 billion notes in circulation, worth about ₴917 billion. About a quarter of notes are worth ₴500. Almost a fifth are worth ₴1000, and their share is rapidly rising. ₴200 notes are fairly common, but their amount more than halved since the peak in March 2022. Despite circulating alongside big 1 hryvnia coins and, since 2018, new smaller coins, there is still a large amount of ₴1 notes in circulation. However, there are now more coins in each denomination up to ₴10 than there are banknotes. ₴20, ₴50 and ₴100 are also relatively rare compared with other denominations.

The detected number of counterfeit hryvnia banknotes was hovering around 5 forged bills per 1 million genuine ones in 2024. Forgery levels dipped in 2022–2023, which was attributed to the Russian full-scale invasion of Ukraine. The vast majority of counterfeit bills (78%) were the third-series ₴500 bills; most other forgeries concerned third-series ₴200 notes.

All descriptions taken from the site of the National Bank of Ukraine.

==== Third series ====
Obverse image	Reverse image	Value	Dimensions (mm)	Main colour	Obverse	Reverse	Date of issue	Printing	Withdrawal	Lapse
1 hryvnia obverse	1 hryvnia reverse	₴1	118 × 63	Green-black	Volodymyr the Great; a depiction of saints	Volodymyr's Fortress Wall in Kyiv Contemporary military equipment, decorations and a cross	1 December 2004	2004, 2005	2 March 2026	Indefinite
1 hryvnia obverse	1 hryvnia reverse	₴1	118 × 63	Yellow-blue	Volodymyr the Great; a depiction of saints	Volodymyr's Fortress Wall in Kyiv Contemporary military equipment, decorations and a cross	22 May 2006	2006, 2011, 2014	2 March 2026	Indefinite
2 hryvni obverse	2 hryvni reverse	₴2	118 × 63	Terracotta	Yaroslav the Wise Contemporary silver coin A paraphrase of part of Yaroslav's deathbed will as it appears in the Primary Chronicle (Note: If you are going to live in kindness to each other, God will be in you (Ukrainian: ...якщо будете жити в любові між собою, Бог буде у вас...))	Saint Sophia Cathedral in Kyiv Contemporary military equipment, decoration and household items; Russkaya Pravda	24 September 2004	2004, 2005, 2011, 2014	2 March 2026	Indefinite
5 hryven' obverse	5 hryven' reverse	₴5	118 × 63	Blue	Bohdan Khmelnytsky Family coat of arms, fragment of Khmelnytsky's signature	St. Elijah Church in the village of Subotiv, Cherkasy Oblast Cossacks' munitions and kleinody (symbols of power)	14 June 2004	2004, 2005, 2011, 2013, 2015	2 March 2026	Indefinite
10 hryven' obverse	10 hryven' reverse	₴10	124 × 66	Crimson	Ivan Mazepa Kurcz coat of arms Quote from one of his poems (Note: For your faith you [shall be ready] to die and your liberties you shall defend (Ukrainian: А за віру хоч умріте, і вольностей бороніте!))	The Holy Dormition Cathedral of the Kyiv Pechersk Lavra Items connected with Mazepa's life	1 November 2004	2004, 2005	2 March 2026	Indefinite
10 hryven' obverse	10 hryven' reverse	₴10	124 × 66	Crimson	Ivan Mazepa Kurcz coat of arms Quote from one of his poems	The Holy Dormition Cathedral of the Kyiv Pechersk Lavra Items connected with Mazepa's life	August 2006	2006, 2011, 2013, 2016	2 March 2026	Indefinite
20 hryven' obverse	20 hryven' reverse	₴20	130 × 69	Green	Ivan Franko A mountainous landscape in the background Facsimile from one of his poems	Lviv Opera and Ballet Theatre Sculpture symbolising Glory from the theatre's roof in close-up	1 December 2003	2003, 2005, 2012, 2014, 2017	Current (gradually replaced with fourth-series banknotes)	Current
50 hryven' obverse	50 hryven' reverse	₴50	136 × 72	Violet	Mykhailo Hrushevskyi Ornaments from Hrushevskyi's History of Ukraine-Rus'	The Central Council of Ukraine building (currently Teacher's House in Kyiv) Statues of a peasant and a worker	29 March 2004	2004, 2005, 2011, 2013, 2014 (Note: Two issues were made in 2014, one with the signature of Stepan Kubiv and the other with the one of Valeria Gontareva)	Current (gradually replaced with fourth-series banknotes)	Current
100 hryven' obverse	100 hryven' reverse	₴100	142 × 75	Yellow, olive	Taras Shevchenko (according to 1840 self-portrait) Face of the woman depicted in Shevchenko's Kateryna Facsimile from one of his poems	Taras Hill near Kaniv, Cherkasy Oblast and the figures of a kobzar with his guide boy	20 February 2006	2006, 2012, 2014	Current (gradually replaced with fourth-series banknotes)	Current
200 hryven' obverse	200 hryven' reverse	₴200	148 × 75	Pink	Lesya Ukrainka Outline of her country house in Kolodiazhne, Volyn Oblast Quote from one of her poems	Entrance tower of Lubart's Castle in Lutsk, a white stork flying	28 May 2007	2007, 2011, 2013, 2014	Current (gradually replaced with fourth-series banknotes)	Current
500 hryven' obverse	500 hryven' reverse	₴500	148 × 75	Peach	Hryhorii Skovoroda (1722 – 1794), philosopher and composer Skovoroda's illustration to his philosophical thesis	The Kyiv Mohyla Academy old main building and a negative of its seal in the background "Pythagorean triangle" as seen by Skovoroda, often interpreted as a Masonic symbol	15 September 2006	2006, 2011, 2014, 2015	Current (gradually replaced with fourth-series banknotes)	Current
These images are to scale at 0.7 pixel per millimetre (18 pixel per inch). For table standards, see the banknote specification table.

==== Fourth series ====
Obverse image	Obverse image	Value	Dimensions (mm)	Main colour	Obverse	Reverse	Date of issue	Printing	Withdrawal
20 hryven' obverse	20 hryven' reverse	₴20 (Note: See also the ₴20 commemorative note, which preceded the common issue one)	130 × 69	Green	Ivan Franko A mountainous landscape Facsimile of one of his poems A stylised flower in optically variable ink	Lviv Opera and Ballet Theatre Sculpture symbolising Glory from the theatre's roof in close-up	25 September 2018	2018, 2021, 2023, 2025	Current
50 hryven' obverse	50 hryven' reverse	₴50	136 × 72	Violet	Mykhailo Hrushevskyi Ornaments from Hrushevskyi's History of Ukraine-Rus' A stylised flag of Ukraine in optically variable ink	The Central Council of Ukraine building (currently Teacher's House in Kyiv) Statues of a peasant and a worker	20 December 2019	2019, 2021, 2024	Current
100 hryven' reverse	100 hryven' reverse	₴100	142 × 75	Yellow and olive	Taras Shevchenko Dnieper as seen from Taras Hill Quote from one of his poems A palette and a paintbrush in SPARK	Red University Building	9 March 2015	2014, 2019, 2021, (Note: The 2019 and 2021 issues have a yellowish watermark area, instead of white) 2022	Current
200 hryven' obverse	200 hryven' obverse	₴200	148 × 75	Pink	Lesya Ukrainka Quote from one of her poems A stylised water lily in SPARK	Entrance tower of Lubart's Castle in Lutsk Motion of the flight of a white stork	25 February 2020	2019, 2021	Current
500 hryven' obverse	500 hryven' reverse	₴500	154 × 75	Beige	Hryhorii Skovoroda Skovoroda's illustration to his philosophical thesis A book with a letter and a feather in SPARK	The Kyiv Mohyla Academy old main building and a negative of its seal in the background	11 April 2016	2015, 2018, 2021, 2023, 2024	Current
1,000 hryven' obverse	1,000 hryven' reverse	₴1,000	160 × 75	Light blue	Volodymyr Vernadsky Composition of a crystal lattice structure and a plant ornament in SPARK	Seat of the Presidium of the National Academy of Sciences of Ukraine	25 October 2019	2019, 2021, 2023, 2024	Current
		₴2,000	166 × 75	Blue	Vasyl Stus A stylised kestrel inspired by Alla Horska Quote from one of his poems A guelder-rose branch and sheets of paper in SPARK	Philology faculty of Donetsk National University	4 September 2026	2026	Current
These images are to scale at 0.7 pixel per millimetre (18 pixel per inch). For table standards, see the banknote specification table.

=== Commemorative issues ===
Obverse image	Reverse image	Denomination	Dimensions (mm)	Main colour	Obverse	Reverse	Date of issue	Quantity
		₴50	136 × 72	Violet	As in third series common circulation banknote; NBU - 20 YEARS (НБУ - 20 РОКІВ) added in SPARK	As in third series common circulation banknote	5 October 2011	1,000
		₴20	130 × 69	Green	General outline as in fourth series common circulation banknote Added window security thread with motion effect Quote swapped places with a security feature - instead of an OVI flower, a SPARK inscription "160 years from the birth [of Ivan Franko]" (160 років від дня народження) appears	As in fourth series common circulation banknote	1 September 2016	1,000,000
		₴100	142 × 75	Olive	As in fourth series common circulation banknote Added an OVMI inscription "30 years of Ukraine's Independence" (30 років Незалежності України) in the watermark area	As in fourth series common circulation banknote	20 August 2021	30,000 of each denomination
		₴500	154 × 75	Beige	As in fourth series common circulation banknote Added an OVMI inscription "30 years of Ukraine's Independence" (30 років Незалежності України) in the watermark area	As in fourth series common circulation banknote	20 August 2021	30,000 of each denomination
		₴20	130 × 69	Green	As in fourth series common circulation banknote Added an OVMI inscription "30 years of Ukraine's Independence" (30 років Незалежності України) in the watermark area	As in fourth series common circulation banknote	19 November 2021	30,000 of each denomination
		₴200	148 × 75	Pink	As in fourth series common circulation banknote Added an OVMI inscription "30 years of Ukraine's Independence" (30 років Незалежності України) in the watermark area	As in fourth series common circulation banknote	19 November 2021	30,000 of each denomination
		₴50	136 × 72	Violet	As in fourth series common circulation banknote Added an OVMI inscription "30 years of Ukraine's Independence" (30 років Незалежності України) in the watermark area	As in fourth series common circulation banknote	22 December 2021	30,000 of each denomination
		₴1,000	160 × 75	Light blue	As in fourth series common circulation banknote Added an OVMI inscription "30 years of Ukraine's Independence" (30 років Незалежності України) in the watermark area	As in fourth series common circulation banknote	22 December 2021	30,000 of each denomination
		₴500	154 × 75	Beige	As in fourth series common circulation banknote Added an OVMI inscription "300[th anniversary] // the world of Skovoroda" (300 СВІТ СКОВОРОДИ) in the watermark area	As in fourth series common circulation banknote	29 December 2022	50,000
		₴20	165 × 80	Blue and yellow	Ukrainian soldiers hoisting the flag of Ukraine, against the backdrop of map of south-eastern Ukraine (eastern Ukraine and Crimea) and the flags of some countries that lent their support to Ukraine; slogans in Ukrainian "And on renewed land the enemy won't be..." (from a poem of Taras Shevchenko), "Slava Ukraini", "Glory to the Heroes". In the watermark area, text in Ukrainian and English explaining Ukraine's position in its war with Russia	Hands tied behind a person's back, poppy in the form of a stylized bullet wound, stylized wings made from candle flames, outlines of destroyed houses, a crown of thorns, an anti-tank hedgehog and guilder rose in SPARK, text in Ukrainian "Remember!", "Let's not forgive!", "Never!"	23 February 2023	300,000
		₴50	165 × 80	Purple	The map of Ukraine, stylized as a heart. The lines were western military aid comes to Ukraine. "Unity saves the world" slogan in Ukrainian	Hands put together, which symbolize cooperation, mutual assistance, trust and partnership; tryzub "Unity is strength" slogan in Ukrainian	23 February 2024	300,000
These images are to scale at 0.7 pixel per millimetre (18 pixel per inch). For table standards, see the banknote specification table.

== Sources ==
=== Books ===
- Shust, Roman (2009). Нумізматика: історія грошового обігу та монетної справи в Україні: Навчальний посібник (in Ukrainian) (2 ed.). Kyiv: Знання. ISBN 978-966-346-397-1.
- Martos, Borys; Zozulya, Yakiv (1972). Money of Ukrainian State in 1917-1920 (in Ukrainian). Munich: Ukrainian Institute of Technology and Economics.
- Kharitonov, Dmitri (2005). Ukrainian paper money 1917-2005. Kyiv: Купола. ISBN 966-8679-03-2.
- Martynyak, T. P. (2005). Грошові знаки та монети України: Альбом. «Українська колекція» (in Ukrainian). Kharkiv: Колорит.
- Cuhaj, George S., ed. (2008). Standard Catalog of World Paper Money. General issues, 1368-1960 (12 ed.). Iola, Wisconsin: Krause Publications. ISBN 978-1-4402-4707-1. OCLC 968251032.
- Hnatyshak, Mykola (1973). Paper Money in Ukraine 1917-1920: History and Description with illustrations of all issues in Ukrainian language with English and German Summaries (in Ukrainian). Cleveland: The Ukrainian Museum-Archives, Inc.
- Hay-Nyzhnyk, Pavlo (2004). Financial policy of the government of the Ukrainian State headed by Pavlo Skoropadsky (29 April - 14 December 1918) (PDF) (in Ukrainian). Kyiv: National Academy of Sciences of Ukraine Kuras Institute of Political and Ethnic Studies.
- Lopata, Vasyl (2000). Надії та розчарування, або метаморфози гривні (in Ukrainian). Kyiv: Дніпро. ISBN 5-308-01758-1.
