= Ukrainian five-hryvnia note =

Current denomination of the Ukrainian currency

Five Ukrainian hryvnias
- Country: Ukraine
- Value: 5 Ukrainian hryvnia
- Width: 118 mm
- Height: 63 mm
- Security features: Holographic stripe, Watermark, Tactile marks, Registration device, Raised printing, UV printing
- Material used: Polymer
- Years of printing: 2004–2015

Obverse
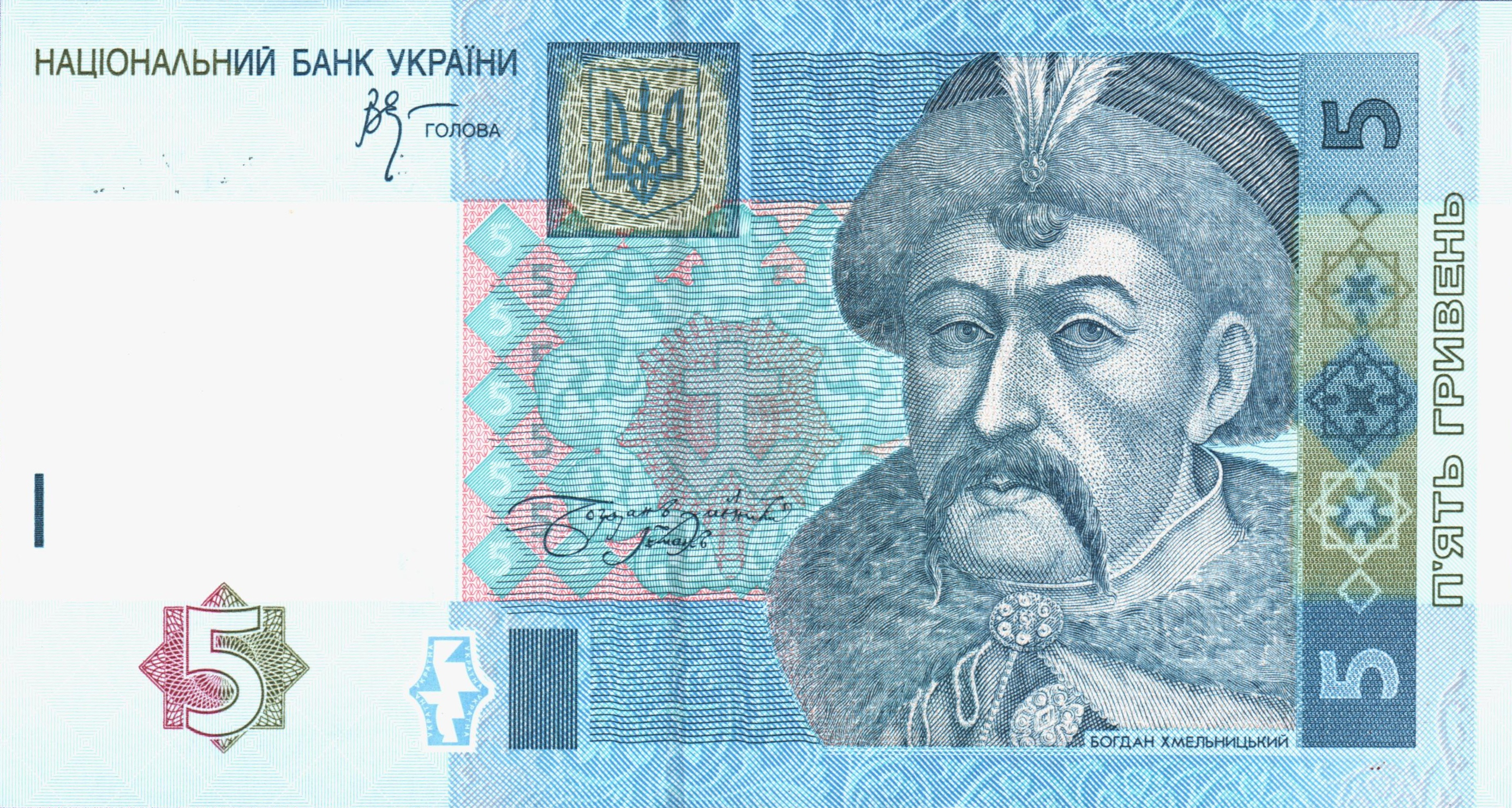
- Design: Bohdan Khmelnytsky
- Design date: 2004

Reverse
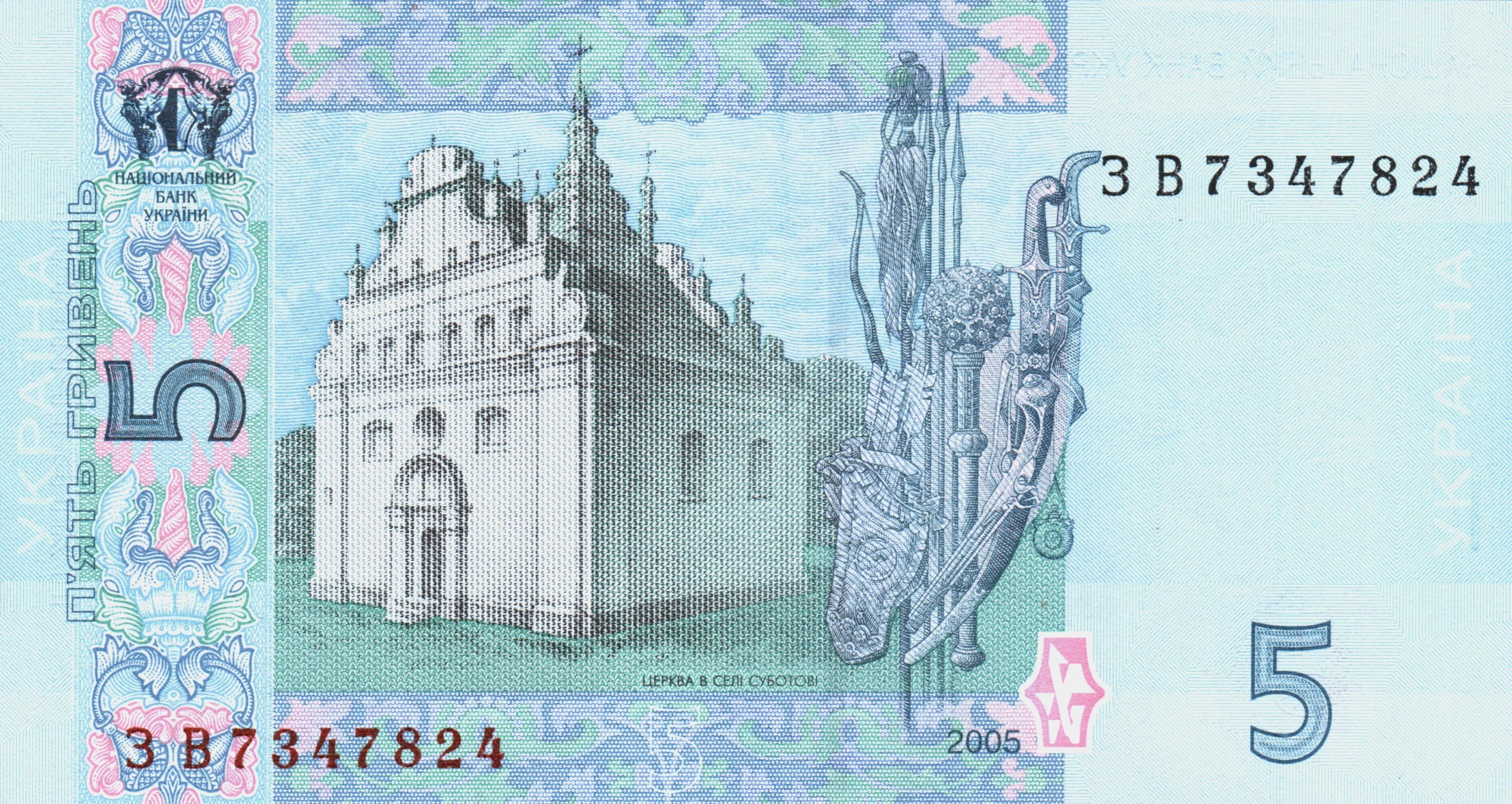
- Design: Illinska Church in Subotiv
- Design date: 2004

The Ukrainian five-hryvnia note (₴5) is one of the banknotes of the Ukrainian hryvnia.

The current five-hryvnia note is predominantly blue in colour. The front features a portrait of Ukrainian Hetman Bohdan Khmelnytsky. The reverse side shows a church in his birthplace village of Subotiv, where he is buried. An updated version of the note began circulation on 14 June 2004, with new security features.

The National Bank of Ukraine introduced a new five-hryvnia coin in 2019, which is gradually replacing the five-hryvnia note.

On 2 March 2026, 1-, 2-, 5-, and 10-hryvnia banknotes ceased to be legal tender.

== History ==
=== Ukrainian People's Republic ===
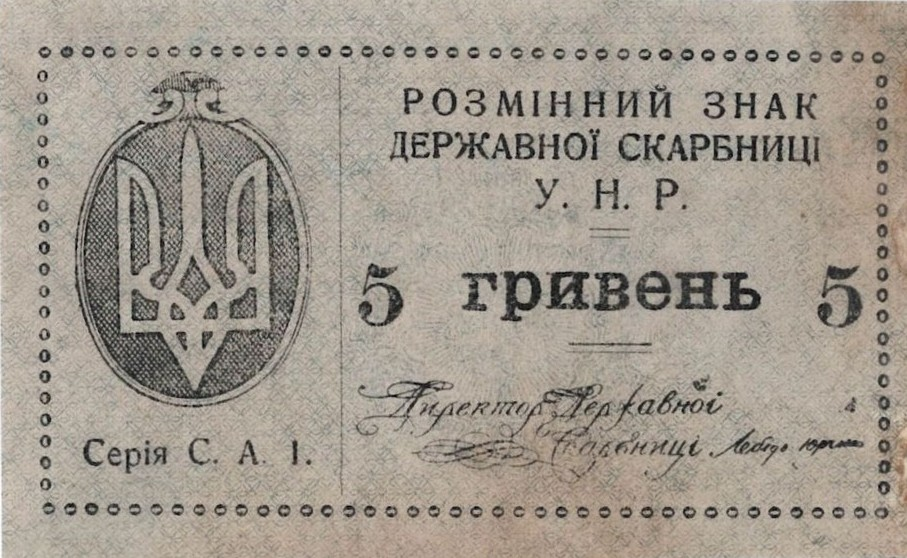
1919 5 Hryvnia banknote, front

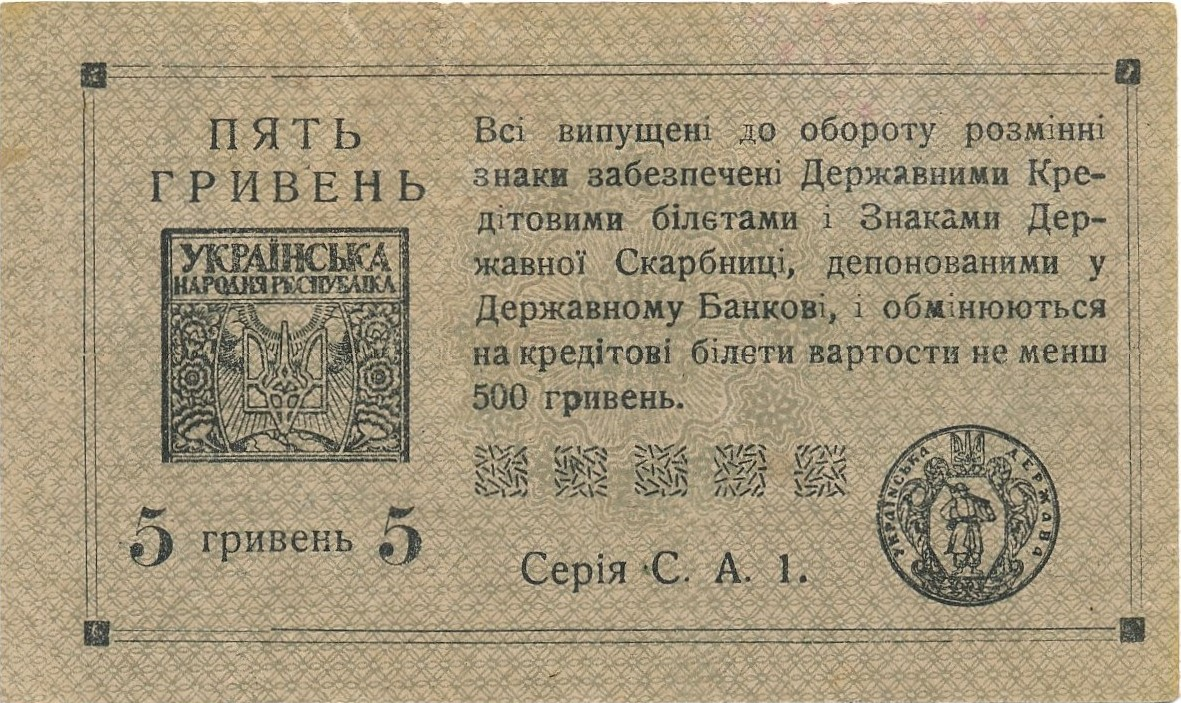
1919 5 Hryvnia banknote, back

=== Modern Ukraine ===
==== 1992 ====
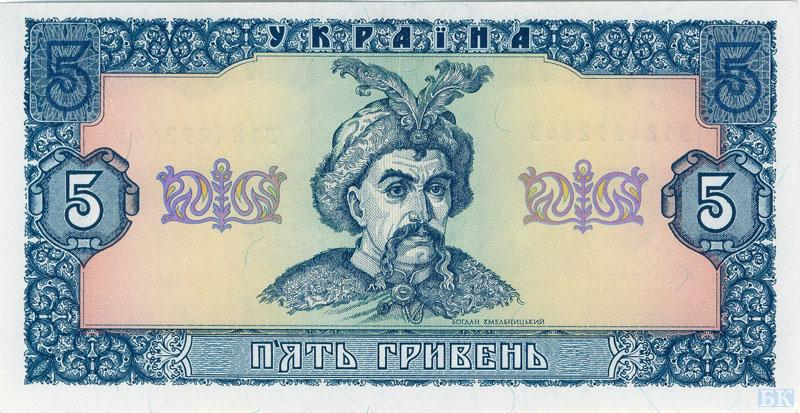
1992 5 Hryvnia banknote, front

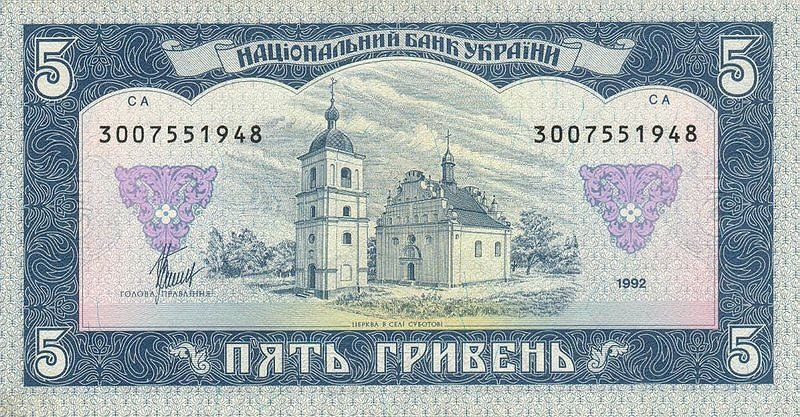
1992 5 Hryvnia banknote, back

==== 1994–2001 ====
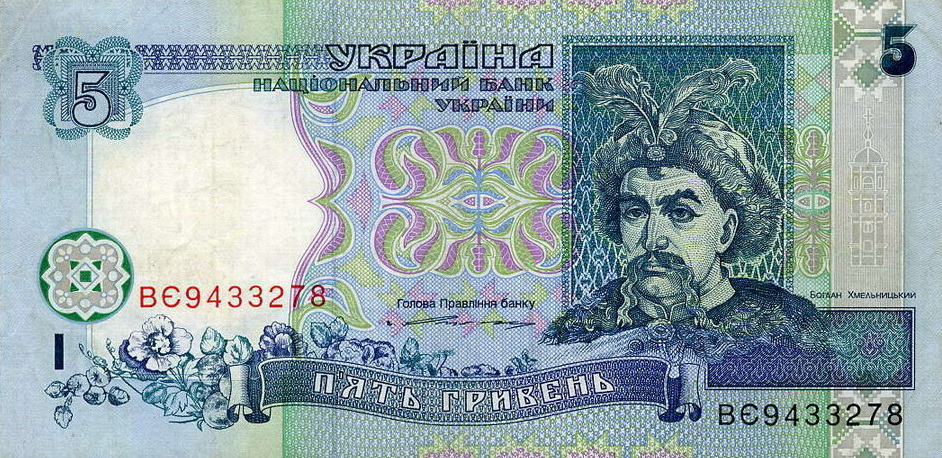
1994 5 Hryvnia banknote, front

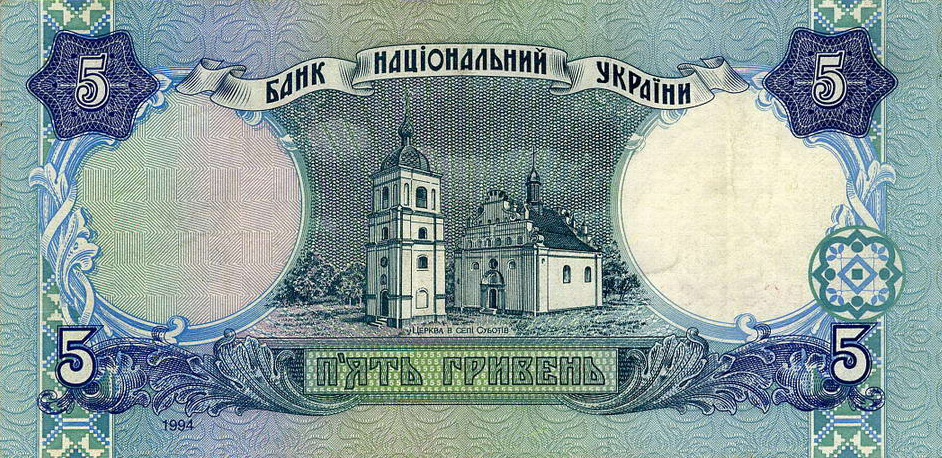
1994 5 Hryvnia banknote, back
