= Museum of Money of the National Bank of Ukraine =

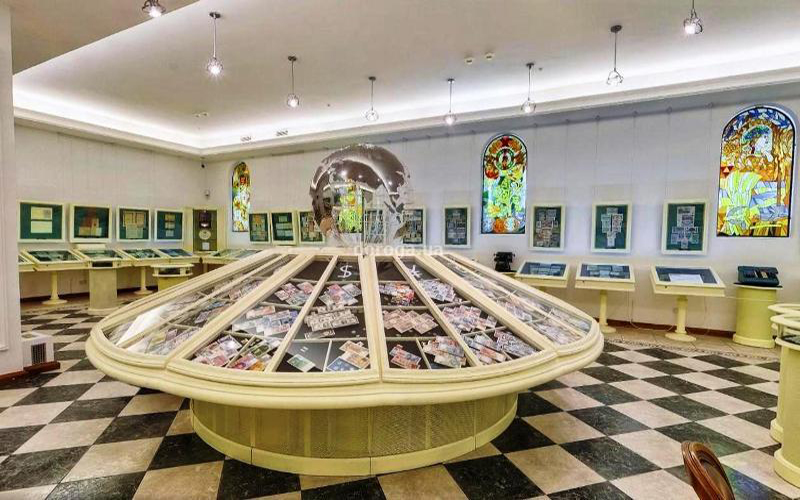
- Established: 2004
- Location: 9 Instytutska Street, Kyiv, Ukraine
- Coordinates: 50°26′51″N 30°31′52″E
- Collection size: over 13 thousand exhibits
- Website: bank.gov.ua

The Museum of Money of the National Bank of Ukraine was officially launched on 24 March 2004 as the Museum of the Ukrainian Branch Office of the State Bank of the USSR. The Museum’s collection (numismatic and notaphily items) reflects the history of money circulation in Ukraine from the ancient times to nowadays. The museum is housed at the National Bank of Ukraine in Kyiv.

Location: 9 Instytutska Street (Entrance 5).

== History ==
The decision to establish the Museum of Money was taken in late 1988. The exhibits of the Museum of the Ukrainian Branch Office of the State Bank of the USSR, which was founded in 1981, formed the basis for the collection.

In accordance with Resolution of the Cabinet of Ministers of Ukraine No. 1766 of 29 November 2000 the NBU Museum of Money is listed as a museum whose collection and exhibits are state property and form part of the State Museum Fund of Ukraine.

The NBU Museum of Money officially opened its doors to the public on 24 March 2004. The museum was launched to mark the tenth anniversary of the printing of the first banknotes of independent Ukraine at the NBU’s Banknote Paper Mill.

The Museum was launched by NBU Governor Serhiy Tihipko, who was in office at that time. Mr. Tihipko, along with 10th grade students from Kyiv International Relations Lyceum 51, joined an excursion to the Museum.

== Collections ==
The museum's exposition is arranged in chronological order, starting from primitive commodities that served as money to the national monetary unit of Ukraine — the hryvnia. The museum's exhibits reflect over thousand-year-long history of the hryvnia and other monetary units that were in circulation at different times in the territory of Ukraine.

The Museum of Money contains the following exhibits (both originals and replicas):

- Coins of the Northern Black Sea Coast inhabited by the Greeks;
- Coins of the Roman Empire in Ukraine (1st and 3rd centuries AD);
- Dirhams of the Caliphate and coins of the Byzantine Empire in the Ukrainian land that circulated during the period when trade flourished with Byzantium and other eastern countries;
- First coins of Kyiv Rus – gold and silver coins (zlatnyky and sriblianyky);
- Coinless Period of the 12th-14th centuries, silver hryvnia ingots as a means of payment;
- Coins of Western Europe of the 15th – 17th centuries;
- Kopiykas of the Tsardom of Moscovy, metal and paper money of the Russian Empire;
- Money of the Ukrainian People's Republic (1917–1920);
- Russian rubles and Ukrainian karbovanets that circulated during the first years of Ukraine's independence;
- Hryvnias of independent Ukraine (1996–2016);
- Full collection of commemorative and jubilee coins of Ukraine;
- Monetary units of other countries.

The colorful stained-glass windows of the museum feature the most important milestones in the history of Ukraine that are reflected in the numismatic exhibits displayed in the museum showcases. These include pre-monetary forms of money (the Bronze Age and the Trypillya culture), money of Kyiv Rus, the Kozak epoch, the Ukrainian People’s Republic of 1917–1920 and present-day Ukraine.

== Present ==
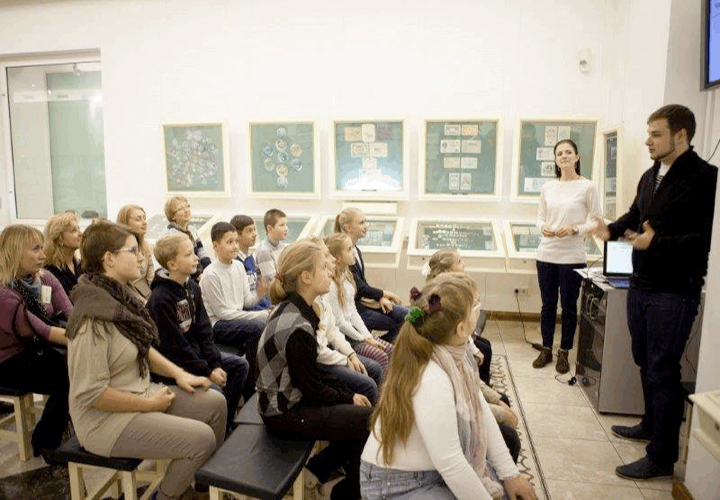
Financial training

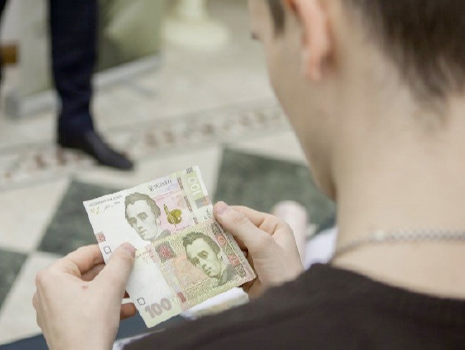
New and old hundred hryvnia

The modern Museum of Money not only offers visitors an opportunity to view the valuable exhibits, but also raise the level of financial literacy among its visitors. Special trainings on savings, the protection of deposits, banknote security features are arranged for schoolchildren and students. These trainings are intended to provide a grasp of basic financial awareness.

Training sessions end with interactive learning which offers visitors an opportunity to strike a coin using a manually operated a coin-minting press and a hammer, a minting technique similar to that used in the Middle Ages.

Visitors are encouraged to pre-register for excursions online through the NBU’s website. The pre-registration procedure involves filling in an application form. The excursion schedule is compiled based on the submitted applications.

The museum’s collection can be viewed online by taking a virtual tour, available on the NBU’s official website. The 3D virtual tour offers viewers an opportunity to explore all the showcases.
