= Ukrainian hryvnia =

Currency of Ukraine

українська гривня (Ukrainian)
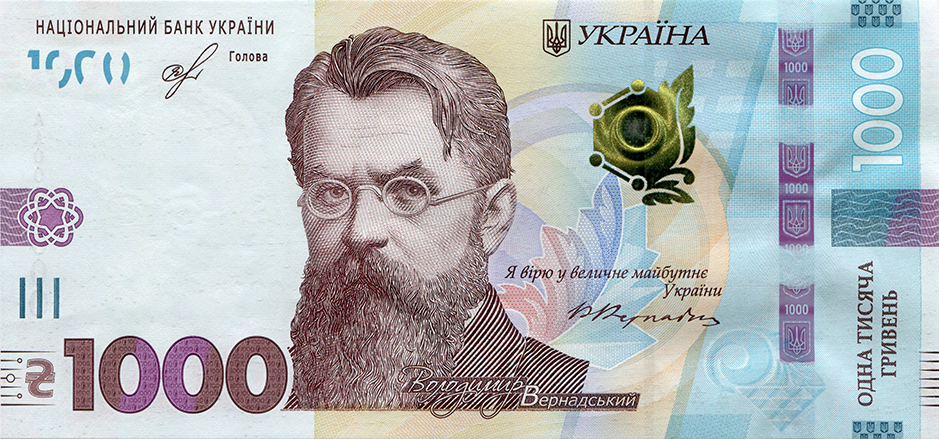
1000 hryvnias banknote
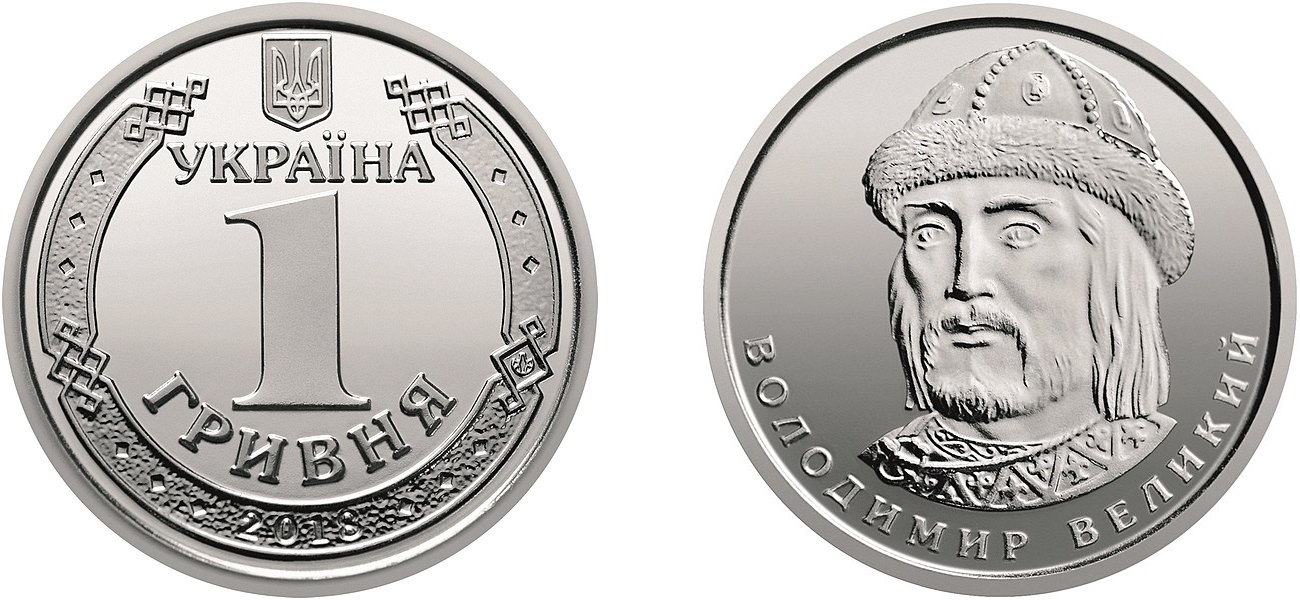
1 hryvnia coin

ISO 4217
- Code: UAH (numeric: 980)
- Subunit: 0.01

Units of account
- Base unit: hryvnia (Ukrainian: гривня)
- Plural: The language(s) of this currency belong(s) to the Slavic languages. There is more than one way to construct plural forms.
- Symbol: ₴
- Subunit
- 1/100: kopiyka (Ukrainian: копійка; in English also: "kopeck”)
- Symbol
- kopiyka: к

Denominations
- Banknotes: ₴20, ₴50, ₴100, ₴200, ₴500, ₴1,000, ₴2,000
- Coins: 50 kopiyka, ₴1, ₴2, ₴5, ₴10

Demographics
- User(s): Ukraine

Issuance
- Central bank: National Bank of Ukraine
- Website: https://bank.gov.ua/en/
- Printer: National Bank of Ukraine
- Mint: National Bank of Ukraine

Valuation
- Inflation: 9.52% (2021 y-o-y)
- Source: NBU, 2019, May
- Method: CPI

The hryvnia (/(hə)ˈrɪvniə/ (hə-)RIV-nee-ə; Ukrainian: гривня [ˈɦrɪu̯nʲɐ], abbr. грн hrn; sign: ₴; code: UAH) has been the national currency of Ukraine since 2 September 1996. Each hryvnia, the base unit, is divided into 100 kopiyka (sometimes called kopecks in English; Ukrainian: копійка). It is named after a measure of weight used in Kievan Rus'.

== Etymology ==
The currency of Kievan Rus' in the 11th century was the grivna. The word is thought to derive from the Slavic griva; which compares with the Ukrainian, Russian, Bulgarian, Croatian, and Serbian word грива (griva, meaning 'mane'). It might have indicated something valuable to be worn around the neck, that was usually made of silver or gold, and may be related to the Bulgarian and Serbian term grivna (гривна, 'bracelet').

Following Ukraine's declared secession from Russia in 1917, the Ukrainian People's Republic named its currency hryvnia after the grivna of Kievan Rus'; these were designed by Heorhiy Narbut.

The word was used to describe silver or gold ingots of a certain weight.

== Currency sign ==
Hryvnia currency sign

The hryvnia sign is a cursive Ukrainian letter He (г), with a double horizontal stroke (₴), symbolizing stability, similar to that used in other currency symbols such as the yen and Chinese yuan (¥, a symbol the currencies share), euro (€), and Indian rupee (₹). The sign was encoded as U+20B4 in Unicode 4.1 and released in 2005. It is now supported by most systems. In Ukraine, if the hryvnia sign is unavailable, the Cyrillic abbreviation "грн" is used (which can be transliterated as "hrn").

== History ==
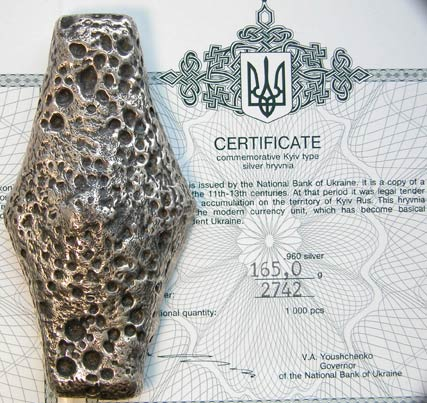
11th–12th century Kyiv hryvnia, as reproduced by the National Bank of Ukraine

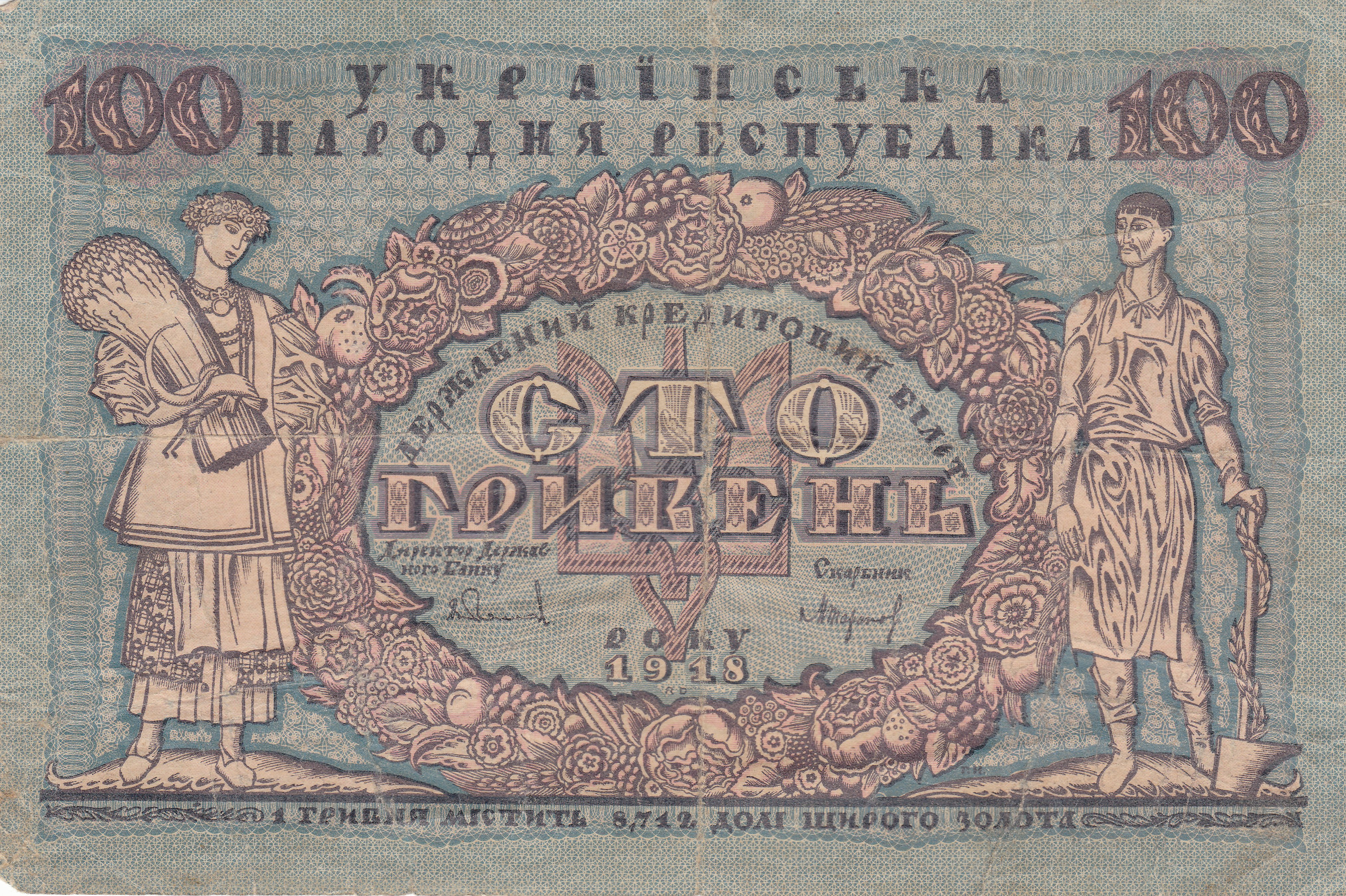
100 hryvnias note of the Ukrainian People's Republic (1918)

On 22 December 1917, the Central Rada established Ukraine's state bank. The karbovanets became first currency of the Ukrainian People's Republic. On 5 January 1918, the first official 100 karbovanets banknote was issued, signed by Mykhailo Kryvetskyi, the first director of the state bank.

On 1 March 1918, the Central Council introduced a new currency, the hryvnia, consisting of 100 shahs and equaled to 1/2 of the previously issued karbovanets banknote.

In April 1918, Hetman Pavlo Skoropadsky reintroduced the karbovanets as the main currency of Ukraine. It consisted of 200 shahs, and denominations of 10, 25, 50, 100, 250 and 1,000 karbovanets were issued.

During the Nazi occupation of Ukraine in World War II, the German occupying government (Reichskommissariat Ukraine) issued banknotes denominated in karbovanets (karbowanez in German).

The third version of the karbovanets replaced rubles at par in 1992. The karbovanets was subject to hyperinflation in the early 1990s following the dissolution of the Soviet Union. The karbovanets was replaced by the hryvnia in September 1996, at a rate of 1 hryvnia to 100,000 karbovanets.

The introduction of the hryvnia was done in a covert fashion. It was introduced according to the Presidential Decree of 26 August 1996, published three days later. During the transition period, 2–16 September, both hryvnias and karbovanets could be used, but change could only be given in hryvnias. All bank accounts were converted to hryvnias automatically. During the transition period, 97% of karbovanets were taken out of circulation, with 56% being removed in the first five days of the currency reform. After 16 September 1996, any remaining karbovanets in circulation could be exchanged for hryvnias in banks.

The hryvnia was introduced when the chairman of the National Bank of Ukraine was Viktor Yushchenko, but the new banknotes bore the signature of the previous chairman, Vadym Hetman. The first notes had been printed in 1992 by the Canadian Bank Note Company, but it was decided to delay their circulation until the hyperinflation in Ukraine had been brought under control.

On 18 March 2014, following the Russian annexation of Crimea, the interim administration of the Republic of Crimea announced that the hryvnia was to be dropped as the region's currency the following month. It was replaced by the Russian ruble on 21 March 2014; the hryvnia was allowed to be used for cash payments until 1 June. Because of a lack of low-denomination Russian rubles in those raions of the Donbas under the control of the pro-Russian separatist states of Donetsk and Luhansk, the hryvnia remained the predominant currency until 2022.

== Coinage ==
Coins were first struck for the new currency in 1992, but were not introduced until September 1996. Initially, coins valued between 1 and 50 kopiyky were issued. In March 1997, ₴1 coins were added. Since 2004, commemorative ₴1 coins have been struck.

In October 2012, the National Bank of Ukraine announced that it was examining the possibility of withdrawing the 1 and 2 kopiyky coins from circulation, as they had become too expensive to produce. After 2013, 1 and 2 kopiyky coins were not produced, but remained in circulation until 1 October 2019. On 26 October 2012, the National Bank of Ukraine announced it was considering the introduction of a ₴2 coin. Officially, as of 1 July 2016, 12.4 billion coins, with a face value of ₴1.4 billion were in circulation. On 1 October 2019, 1, 2 and 5 kopiyky coins ceased to be legal tender. They can be still changed at banks.

Coins of the Ukrainian Hryvnia (1992–present)
| Image | | Value | Technical parameters | | | Description | | | Date of | | |
| Obverse | Reverse | Value | Diameter | Mass | Composition | Edge | Obverse | Reverse | minting | issue | withdrawal |
|---|---|---|---|---|---|---|---|---|---|---|---|
| | | 1 kopiyka | 16 mm | 1.5 g | Stainless steel | Plain | Value, Ornaments | Ukrainian Trident | 1992–2016 | 2 September 1996 | Not issued since 1 July 2018. 1, 2, and 5-kopiyka coins withdrew from general circulation on 1 October 2019. |
| | | 2 kopiykas | 17.30 mm | 0.64 g (1992~1996); 1.8 g (2001–) | aluminium (1992–1996), stainless steel (2001–) | Plain | Value, Ornaments | Ukrainian Trident | 1992–2014 | 2 September 1996 | Not issued since 1 July 2018. 1, 2, and 5-kopiyka coins withdrew from general circulation on 1 October 2019. |
| | | 5 kopiykas | 24 mm | 4.3 g | stainless steel | Reeded | Value, Ornaments | Ukrainian Trident | 1992–2015 | 2 September 1996 | Not issued since 1 July 2018. 1, 2, and 5-kopiyka coins withdrew from general circulation on 1 October 2019. |
| | | 10 kopiykas | 16.3 mm | 1.7 g | brass (1992–1996), aluminium bronze (2001–) | Reeded | Value, Ornaments | Ukrainian Trident | 1992–2022 | 2 September 1996 | 10-kopiyka coins withdrew from general circulation on 1 October 2025. |
| | | 25 kopiykas | 20.8 mm | 2.9 g | brass (1992–1996), aluminium bronze (2001–) | Reeded and plain sectors | Value, Ornaments | Ukrainian Trident | 1992–2016 | 2 September 1996 | Not issued since 1 July 2018. 25-kopiyka coin ceased to be legal tender in Ukraine and gone out of circulation, effective 1 October 2020. |
| | | 50 kopiykas | 23 mm | 4.2 g | brass (1992–1996), aluminium bronze (2001–) | Reeded and plain sectors | Value, Ornaments | Ukrainian Trident | 1992~present | 2 September 1996 | Current |
| | | 1 hryvnia | 26 mm | 7.1 g (1995,1996); 6.9 g (2001–) | brass (1995, 1996), aluminium bronze (2001–) | Inscription: "ОДНА ГРИВНЯ", minted year | Value, Ornaments | Ukrainian Trident | 1995~2013 | 12 March 1997 | Current, but new design introduced in 2018 |
| | | 1 hryvnia | 26 mm | 6.8 g (2004–2016) | Aluminium bronze (2004–2016) | Plain with incuse lettering ("ОДНА · ГРИВНЯ · Date of issue") | Inscription: Coat of arms of Ukraine; УКРАЇНА 1 ГРИВНЯ; date of issue inside a decorative wreath | Half length figure of Volodymyr the Great holding a model church and staff with legend above | 2004–2016 | 2004 | Current, but new design introduced in 2018 |
| | | 1 hryvnia | 18.9 mm | 3.3 g | Nickel-plated steel | Reeded | Coat of Arms of Ukraine, Value, Ornaments | Volodymyr the Great | 2018 | | Current |
| | | 2 hryvnias | 20.2 mm | 4.0 g | Nickel-plated steel | Reeded | Coat of Arms of Ukraine, Value, Ornaments | Yaroslav the Wise | 2018 | | Current |
| | | 5 hryvnias | 22.1 mm | 5.2 g | Nickel-plated steel | Segmented (Plain and Reeded edges) | Coat of Arms of Ukraine, Value, Ornaments | Bohdan Khmelnytsky | 2019 | | Current |
| | | 10 hryvnias | 23.5 mm | 6.4 g | Nickel plated zinc alloy | Reeded | Coat of Arms of Ukraine, Value, Ornaments | Ivan Mazepa | 2020 | | Current |
These images are to scale at 2.5 pixels per millimetre. For table standards, see the coin specification table.

== Banknotes ==
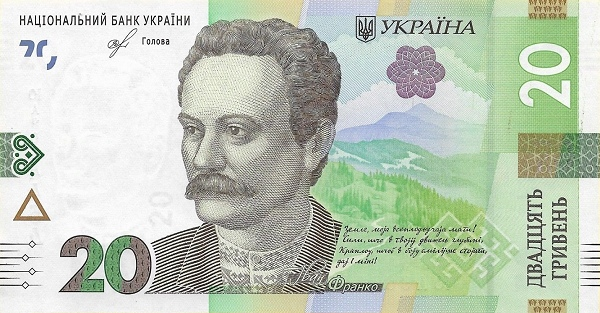
Obverse of a 20 Ukrainian hryvnia banknote, 2018

In 1996, the first series of hryvnia banknotes was introduced into circulation by the National Bank of Ukraine. They were dated 1992 and were in denominations of 1, 2, 5, 10 and 20 hryvnias. The design of the banknotes was developed by Ukrainian artists Vasyl Lopata and Borys Maksymov. The one hryvnia banknotes were printed by the Canadian Bank Note Company in 1992. The two, five and ten hryvnia banknotes were printed two years later. The banknotes were stored in Canada until they were put into circulation.

Banknotes of the first series in denominations of 50 and 100 hryvnias also existed but were not introduced because these nominals were not needed in the economic crisis of the mid-1990s.

Also in 1996, the 1, 50, and 100 hryvnia notes of the second series were introduced, with 1 hryvnia dated 1994. The banknotes were designed and printed by Britain's De La Rue. Since the opening of the Mint of the National Bank of Ukraine in cooperation with De La Rue in March 1994, all banknotes have been printed in Ukraine.

Later, higher denominations were added. The 200 hryvnia notes of the second series were introduced in 2001, followed by the 500 hryvnia notes of the third series in 2006, and 1000 hryvnia notes of fourth series in 2019.

The 100 hryvnia denomination is quite common due to its moderately high value. Also common is the 200 and 500 hryvnia, as most Ukrainian ATMs dispense currency in these denominations.

In 2016, the NBU paper factory started producing banknote paper using flax instead of cotton.

In 2019, the National Bank of Ukraine introduced a 1,000 hryvnia banknote and was issued into circulation on 25 October 2019. The introduction of the new banknote was in response to the National Bank of Ukraine's efforts of streamlining the number of coins and banknotes already in circulation. The 1, 2, 5 and 10 hryvnia banknotes will continue to be legal tender alongside its equivalent coins in general circulation, while being withdrawn from circulation from repeated use in commerce.

In 2019, the National Bank of Ukraine introduced a revised 50 hryvnia banknote into circulation on 20 December 2019 and issued a revised 200 hryvnia banknote on 25 February 2020, thereby completing the family of notes which began with the issuance of the 100 hryvnia banknote in 2015.

In 2026, the National Bank of Ukraine introducted a 2,000 hryvnia banknote, which was issued into circulation on 4 September 2026.

=== Current series ===
| Denomination and dimensions | Image | | Main colour | Description | | | Date of issue | Withdrawal |
| Denomination and dimensions | Obverse | Reverse | Main colour | Watermark | Obverse | Reverse | Date of issue | Withdrawal |
|---|---|---|---|---|---|---|---|---|
| ₴1; 118 × 63 mm | | | Yellow-blue | Volodymyr the Great of Kiev (c. 958–1015), Prince of Novgorod and Grand Prince of Kiev; Ruler of Kievan Rus' in (980–1015) | | Volodymyr I's Fortress Wall in Kiev | 22 May 2006 | 2 March 2026 |
| ₴2; 118 × 63 mm | | | Terracotta | Yaroslav the Wise (c. 978 – 1054), Prince of Novgorod and Grand Prince of Kiev; Ruler of Kievan Rus' in (1019–1054) | | Saint Sophia Cathedral, Kyiv | 24 September 2004 | 2 March 2026 |
| ₴5; 118 × 63 mm | | | Blue | Bohdan Khmelnytsky (c. 1595–1657), Hetman of Ukraine | | St Elijah's Church in the village of Subotiv | 14 June 2004 | 2 March 2026 |
| ₴10; 124 × 66 mm | | | Crimson | Ivan Mazepa (1639–1709), Hetman of Ukraine | | The Holy Dormition Cathedral of the Kyiv Pechersk Lavra | 1 November 2004 | 2 March 2026 |
| ₴20; 130 × 69 mm | | | Green | Ivan Franko (1856–1916), writer and politician | | Lviv Theatre of Opera and Ballet | 25 September 2018 | Current |
| ₴50; 136 × 72 mm | | | Violet | Mykhailo Hrushevskyi (1866–1934), historian and politician. | | The Central Rada building ("House of the Teacher" in Kyiv) | 20 December 2019 | Current |
| ₴100; 142 × 75 mm | | | Olive | Taras Shevchenko (1814–1861), poet and artist | | Red Building of the Taras Shevchenko National University of Kyiv | 9 March 2015 | Current |
| ₴200; 148 × 75 mm | | | Pink | Lesya Ukrainka (1871–1913), poet and writer | | Entrance Tower of Lutsk Castle | 25 February 2020 | Current |
| ₴500; 154 × 75 mm | | | Brown | Hryhorii Skovoroda (1722–1794), philosopher and poet | | National University of Kyiv-Mohyla Academy | 11 April 2016 | Current |
| ₴1,000; 160 × 75 mm | | | Aqua | Volodymyr Vernadskyi (1863–1945), historian, philosopher, naturalist and scientist | | National Academy of Sciences of Ukraine | 25 October 2019 | Current |
| ₴2,000; 166 × 75 mm | | | Blue | Vasyl Stus (1938–1985), poet, translator, literary critic, journalist and dissident | | Philology faculty of Donetsk National University | 4 September 2026 | Current |
These images are to scale at 0.7 pixel per millimetre (18 pixel per inch). For table standards, see the banknote specification table.

== Exchange rates ==
Official NBU exchange rate at moment of introduction was UAH 1.76 per 1 US dollar.

Following the 1997 Asian financial crisis, the currency was devalued to UAH 5.6 = USD 1.00 in February 2000. The exchange rate then remained relatively stable at around 5.4 hryvnias for 1 US dollar and was fixed to 5.05 hryvnias for 1 US dollar from 21 April 2005 until 21 May 2008. In mid-October 2008 rapid devaluation began, as a result of the 2008 financial crisis that led to the 2008–09 Ukrainian financial crisis, with the hryvnia dropping 38.4% from UAH 4.85 for 1 US dollar on 23 September 2008 to UAH 7.88 for 1 US dollar on 19 December 2008. After a period of instability, a new peg of 8 hryvnias per US dollar was established, remaining for several years. In 2012, the peg was changed to a managed float (much like that of the Chinese yuan) as the euro and other European countries' currencies weakened against the dollar due to the European debt crisis, and the value in mid-2012 was about ₴8.14 per dollar.

As from 7 February 2014, following political instability in Ukraine, the National Bank of Ukraine changed the hryvnia into a fluctuating/floating currency in an attempt to meet IMF requirements and to try to enforce a stable price for the currency in the Forex market. In 2014 and 2015, the hryvnia lost about 70% of its value against the U.S. dollar, with the currency reaching a record low of ₴33 per dollar in February 2015.

On 31 July 2019, the hryvnia to U.S. dollar exchange rate in the interbank foreign exchange market strengthened to ₴24.98 — the highest level in 3 years.

Following the Russian invasion of Ukraine, the official exchange rate of hryvnia was fixed at ₴29.25 per U.S. dollar and ₴33.17 per euro. On 21 July 2022, it was devalued to ₴36.5686 per US dollar, to bring it into alignment with the black market.

The international mid-market exchange rate fluctuates, but values the hryvnia slightly lower than the official rate.

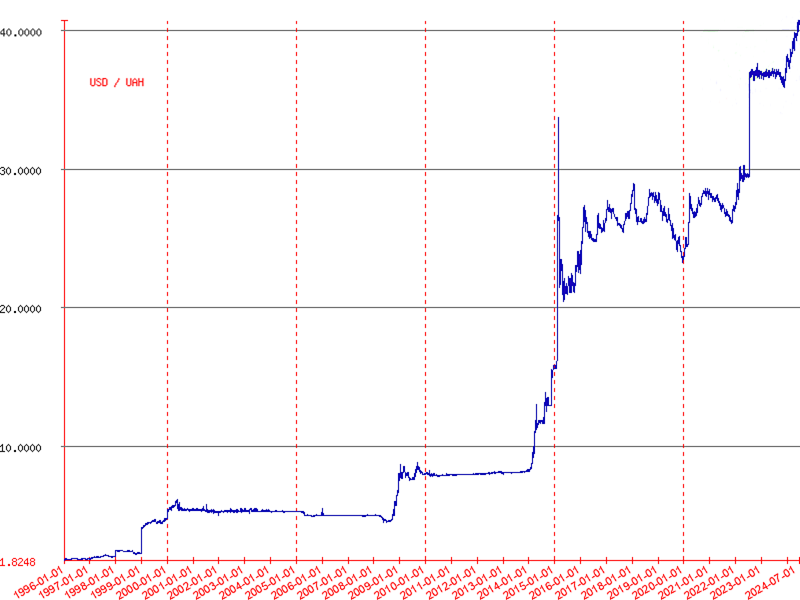
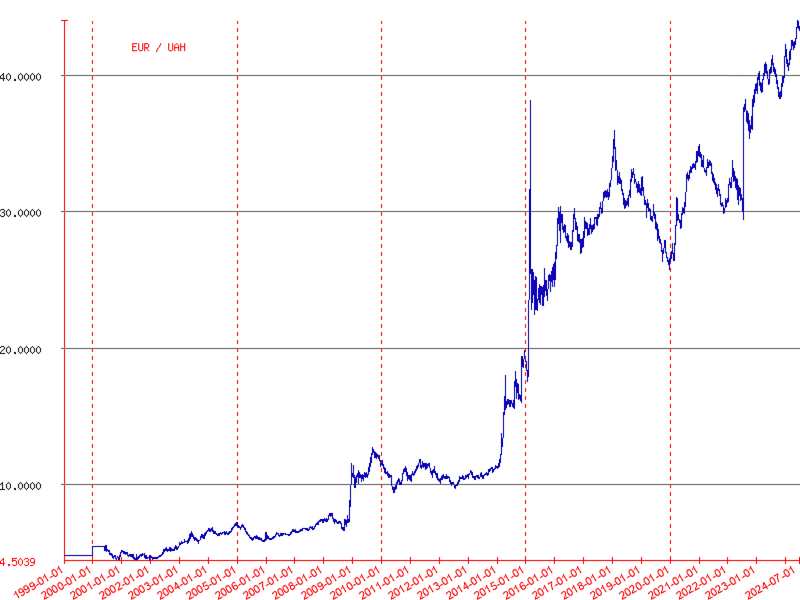
Hryvnia exchange rate to US dollar (from 1996) and Euro (from 1999)

| Year | USD | EUR | RUB | CHF | BTC |
|---|---|---|---|---|---|
| 2000 | 5.3345 | 4.9415 | | 3.2246 | |
| 2001 | 5.4125 | 4.4860 | | 3.1871 | |
| 2002 | 5.3304 | 5.0023 | | 3.4288 | |
| 2003 | 5.3318 | 6.1980 | | 3.9614 | |
| 2004 | 5.3072 | 6.9395 | 0.1986 | 4.2818 | |
| 2005 | 5.2799 | 6.1312 | 0.1805 | 4.1275 | |
| 2006 | 5.0500 | 6.3620 | 0.1843 | 4.0278 | |
| 2007 | 5.0500 | 7.0010 | 0.1943 | 4.2116 | |
| 2008 | 6.8777 | 8.9879 | 0.2433 | 4.8609 | |
| 2009 | 7.7038 | 11.2046 | 0.2619 | 7.1950 | 0.0000 |
| 2010 | 7.9356 | 10.5329 | 0.2610 | 7.6261 | 3.2992 |
| 2011 | 7.9930 | 11.0921 | 0.2720 | 9.0141 | 105.3409 |
| 2012 | 7.9880 | 10.2706 | 0.2570 | 8.5208 | 38.6018 |
| 2013 | 7.9930 | 10.6122 | 0.2510 | 8.6233 | 1,573.15 |
| 2014 | 12.2967 | 15.7159 | 0.3110 | 12.9501 | 5,428.19 |
| 2015 | 21.5751 | 24.2287 | 0.3620 | 22.6973 | 7,956.56 |
| 2016 | 25.2860 | 28.2919 | 0.3830 | 25.9546 | 13,427.58 |
| 2017 | 27.1194 | 30.0042 | 0.4560 | 26.9990 | 115,302.94 |
| 2018 | 27.4550 | 32.1429 | 0.4360 | 27.8305 | 219,979.42 |
| 2019 | 24.4558 | 28.9518 | 0.3990 | 26.0025 | 189,893.73 |
| 2020 | 25.4555 | 30.7900 | 0.3740 | 28.7600 | 313,830.20 |
| 2021 | 27.7235 | 32.3100 | 0.3700 | 29.8600 | 1,304,733.15 |
| 2022 | 34.5886 | 35.9210 | 0.4476 | 35.5610 | 815,943.77 |
| 2023 | 36.4136 | 38.3263 | 0.4054 | 40.1478 | 1,052,340.81 |
| 2024 | 38.3109 | 41.5476 | 0.4189 | 43.6031 | 1,818,454.39 |
| 2025 | 41.7680 | 47.1523 | 0.5495 | 50.3176 | 4,300,163.24 |

Current UAH exchange rates
| From Google Finance: | AUD CAD CHF CNY EUR GBP HKD JPY USD |
| From Yahoo! Finance: | AUD CAD CHF CNY EUR GBP HKD JPY USD |
| From XE.com: | AUD CAD CHF CNY EUR GBP HKD JPY USD |
| From OANDA: | AUD CAD CHF CNY EUR GBP HKD JPY USD |

== See also ==
- Economy of Ukraine
- List of commemorative coins of Ukraine
- List of currencies in Europe

== Bibliography ==
- Krause, Chester L.; Clifford Mishler (1991). Standard Catalog of World Coins: 1801–1991 (18th ed.). Krause Publications. ISBN 0873411501.
- Cuhaj, George S., ed. (2006). Standard Catalog of World Paper Money: Modern Issues 1961-Present (12th ed.). Krause Publications. ISBN 0-89689-356-1.

| Preceded by: Various | Currency of Kievan Rus'; 11th century – 15th century | Succeeded by: Various |

| Preceded by: Ukrainian karbovanets | Currency of Ukrainian People's Republic; 1 March 1918 – April 1918 | Succeeded by: Ukrainian karbovanets Reason: coup d'état (on 29 April 1918) |

| Preceded by: Ukrainian karbovanets Reason: coup d'état (on 14 December 1918) | Currency of Ukrainian People's Republic; December 1918 – November 1920 | Succeeded by: Soviet karbovanets Reason: Soviet reintegration |

| Preceded by: Ukrainian karbovanets Reason: inflation (on 2 September 1996); Ratio: 1 hryvnia = 100,000 karbovanets | Currency of Ukraine; 2 September 1996 – | Succeeded by: Current |
