= Hryvnia sign =

Currency symbol for the Ukrainian hryvnia

₴

Hryvnia sign
- In Unicode: U+20B4 ₴ HRYVNIA SIGN

Currency
- Currency: Ukrainian hryvnia

The hryvnia sign (₴) is a currency symbol, used for the Ukrainian hryvnia currency since 2004.

In 2004, when the National Bank of Ukraine approved the ₴ currency symbol for the hryvnia, it was also stated that the symbol could be written either before (₴500) or after (500 ₴) the denomination. The most recent Ukrainian orthography rules of 2019 do not regulate this usage.

== Description ==
The hryvnia sign is a cursive minuscule Ukrainian Cyrillic letter He (г), or a mirrored letter S, with a double horizontal stroke, symbolising stability, similar to that used in other currency symbols such as ¥ or €. Hryvnia is abbreviated "грн" (hrn) in Ukrainian. The hryvnia sign ₴ was released in March 2004.

The specific design of the hryvnia sign was a result of a public contest held by the National Bank of Ukraine in 2003. The bank announced that it would not take any special steps of promoting the sign, but expressed expectations that the recognition and the technical possibilities of rendering the sign would follow. As soon as the sign was announced, a proposal to encode it was written. The sign is Unicode encoded as U+20B4 ₴ HRYVNIA SIGN since version 4.1 (2005). The symbol appears in the filigree of the 1 hryvnia and the recently introduced 1,000 hryven banknote.

== See also ==
- Ukrainian hryvnia
- Currency symbol
