= St. Elijah Church, Subotiv =

St. Elijah Church
- Іллінська церква
- Side view of the church and its bell tower
- St. Elijah Church
- 49°05′40″N 32°33′17″E
- Location: Subotiv, Cherkasy Oblast
- Country: Ukraine
- Denomination: Orthodox Church of Ukraine

History
- Founder: Bohdan Khmelnytsky
- Dedication: Saint Elijah

Architecture
- Style: Renaissance and Baroque
- Completed: 1653 or 1656

Immovable Monument of National Significance of Ukraine
- Official name: Церква Святого Іллі з дзвіницею (St. Elijah Church and bell tower)
- Type: Architecture, urban planning
- Reference no.: 230039-Н

St. Elijah Church (Ukrainian: Іллінська церква) is a church in Subotiv, Ukraine. It was built by order of Hetman Bohdan Khmelnytsky in 1653 or 1656, and since then was part of his estate. He was probably buried there after his death. The church is recognized as an architectural and urban planning monument of national significance.

== History ==
In the mid-17th century, Hetman Bohdan Khmelnytsky ordered the construction of a fortified palace in Subotiv, his hometown. The St. Elijah Church was bult as part of the estate in 1653 or 1656, though located on a separate hill outside of the fortress walls. The building was intended to be the dynastic mausoleum of the noble Khmelnytsky family. The Hrabianka Chronicle and the Velychko Chronicle state that Bohdan's son Tymosh was buried in the church after his death at the Siege of Suceava in 1653, followed by the burial of Bohdan himself in 1657. However, Paul of Aleppo describes the Hetman's burial in St. Michael's Church in the village center, a structure which has not survived to modern times, and notes that St. Elijah Church was still under construction at the time. Thus, the actual place of Bohdan Khmelnytsky's burial remains uncertain. According to the Chernihiv Chronicle, Tymosh's and Bohdan's bodies was desecrated following the capture of Subotiv by Stefan Czarniecki in 1664, a claim which is not found in other contemporary sources. Some researchers have also suggested that his body was relocated to a safe place by the Cossacks, or that his tomb was plundered by the Russians later.

St. Elijah Church was in a dilapidated state by the early 19th century. In 1845, Taras Shevchenko painted the church and Cossack burials around it. In the 1850s, it was planned to demolish the building, but in 1862, it was saved from destruction by priest Roman Orlovsky. He attained renovation funds from the Most Holy Synod after convincing it that Bohdan Khmelnytsky was not buried in the church. A bell tower connected to the church was built in 1869, and the church was consecrated the same year.

In the 1930s, religious ceremonies in St. Elijah Church were suspended by Soviet authorities. Its iconostasis was destroyed, and the building was used as a club, and later as a warehouse. Worship in the church was restored during the Nazi occupation in 1941 but was stopped in 1961 as part of Khrushchev's anti-religious campaign. Following the reconstruction works in 1969‒1978, the vestibule connecting the bell tower with the church was destroyed, and the church regained some of its original forms. In 1969‒1973, three Cossack burials were discovered, though researchers concluded that neither Tymosh nor Bohdan Khmelnytsky is among them.

Since 1989, St. Elijah Church is part of the National Historic and Cultural Reserve "Chyhyryn". The church ownership was transferred to the Ukrainian Orthodox Church (Moscow Patriarchate) in 1990. In 1995, the copper roof cover and the 19th-century iconostasis were restored. Further interior restoration works were performed in 2007‒2009, when the Soviet-era plaque commemorating the "reunification of Ukraine with Russia" was replaced by a cenotaph of Bohdan Khmelnytsky. In 2012, the church and its bell tower were inscribed on the State Register of Immovable Monuments as an architectural and urban planning monument of national significance. In 2019, a geomagnetic scan of the building revealed an anomaly under its nave, which could be the crypt of Khmelnytsky. St. Elijah Church currently belongs to the Orthodox Church of Ukraine.

== Architecture ==
St. Elijah Church was built out of sandstone and brick. According to historian Ivan Krypiakevych, the stone originated from a ruined mosque. The building's size is 23×14 m. It has one long, rectangular nave leading to an apse. A ridge turret tops the roof. There is a two-tiered Mannerist pediment above the portal. The vault is semicircular, and there are choir lofts above the entrance. There are underground structures under the building which have not been fully explored. The church walls are two meters thick, and several loopholes are incorporated into the structure, indicating that the building was intended to be a fortified church. Its style is transitional between Renaissance and Baroque, serving as an early example of Ukrainian Baroque. The 19th-century bell tower has a rectangular plan and is taller than the church. Its style is neutral and harmonious with the church. Both buildings are plastered and whitewashed.

== Gallery ==
Aerial view

Front view

Back view

Bell tower

Interior

Cenotaph of Bohdan Khmelnytsky

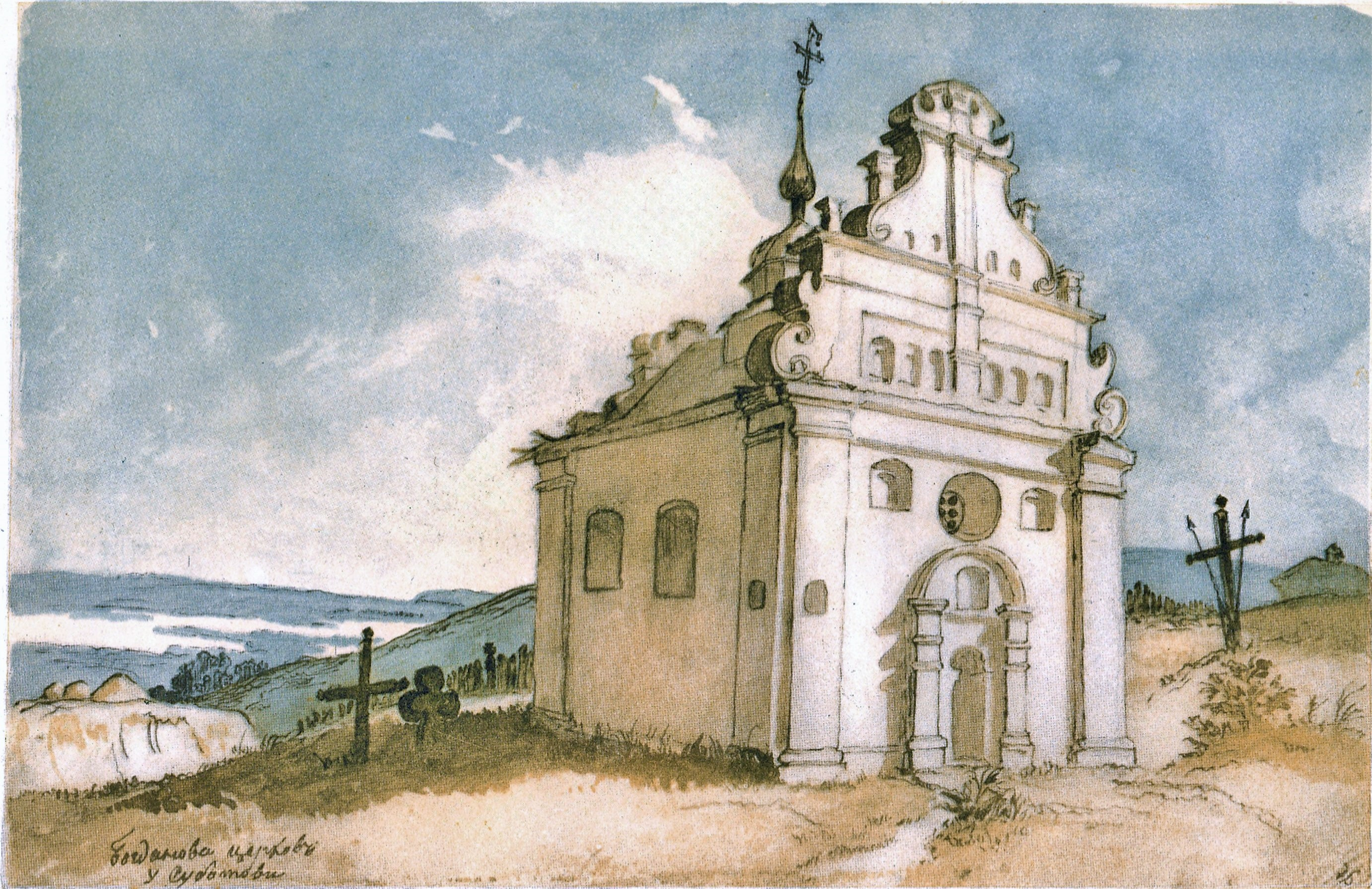
Taras Shevchenko's painting of the church (1845)

St. Elijah Church on the 5 hryvnia banknote
