= Coins of the Ukrainian hryvnia =

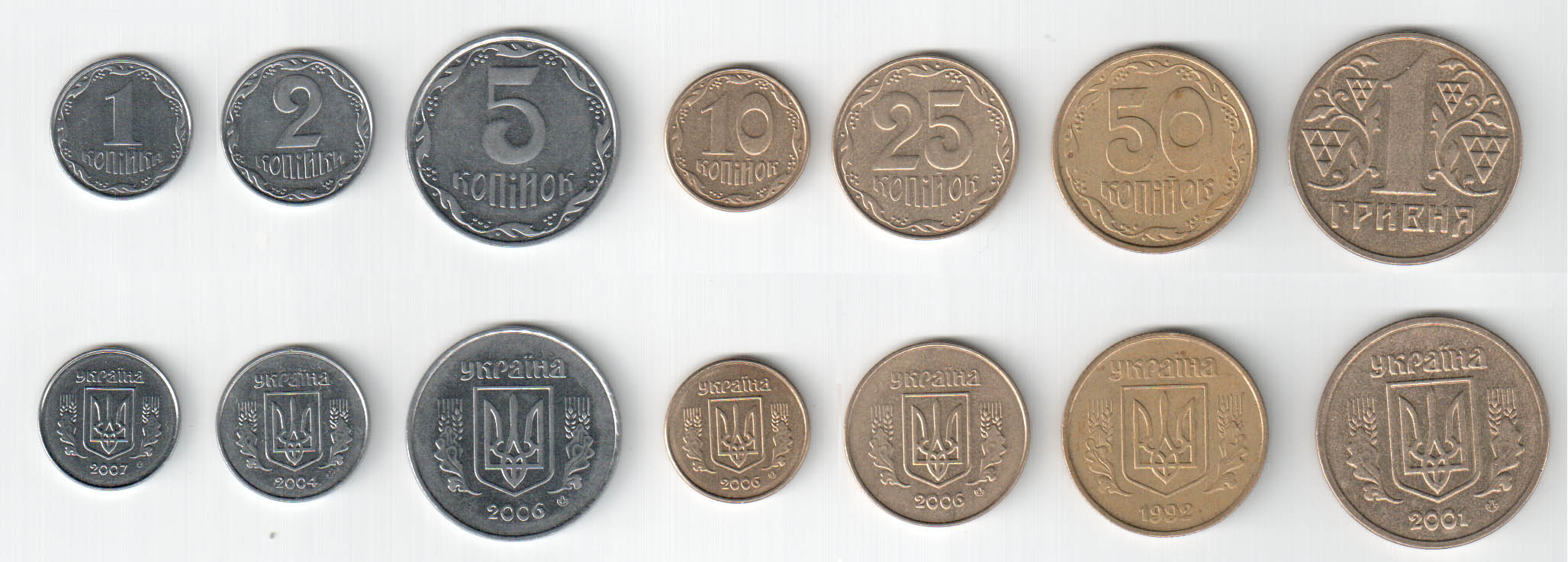
Coins of Ukraine in circulation.

Coins of the Ukrainian hryvnia were first minted in 1992. Coins were first struck in 1992 for the new currency but were not introduced until September 1996. Initially, coins valued between 1 and 50 kopiyok were issued. In March 1997, 1 hryvnia coins were added; they are however rarely seen in circulation. The note of the same value is far more commonly used. Since 2004 several commemorative 1 hryvnia coins have been struck. New coins have been produced annually since then and they make up a valuable aspect of the Ukrainian currency system. Today, circulating coins exist in denominations of 1 kopiyka (i.e. or ₴0.01), 2, 5, (all demonetised in 2019) 10, 25 (also demonetised) and 50 kopiyok, ₴1, ₴2, ₴5 and ₴10. Also minted are bullion (including gold, silver and platinum) and commemorative coins. All of these are produced by the National Bank of Ukraine.

In October 2012, the National Bank of Ukraine announced that it is examining the possibility of withdrawing the 1 and 2 kopiyky-coins from circulation; the withdrawal started on 1 October 2019. The coins had become too expensive to produce compared to their nominal value. In the same month, the Bank proposed the introduction of the 2 hryvnia coin; this was finally issued as a circulation coin in April 2018. While 5 and 10 hryvnia coins were issued in 2019 and 2020, respectively.

== Production ==
Until 2001, most coins were struck by the Luhansk Cartridge Factory. Also, in 1992, coins of 1, 5, 10 and 25 kopiyok were struck by the Italian mint. Since 2001, all Ukrainian coins are struck at the mint of the National Bank of Ukraine.

All circulation coins have been designed by Vasyl Lopata (1941—2025).

Coins of the Ukrainian Hryvnia (1992–present)
| Image | | Value | Technical parameters | | | Description | | | Date of | | |
| Obverse | Reverse | Value | Diameter | Mass | Composition | Edge | Obverse | Reverse | minting | issue | withdrawal |
|---|---|---|---|---|---|---|---|---|---|---|---|
| | | 1 kopiyka | 16. mm | 1.5 g | Stainless steel | Plain | Value, Ornaments | Ukrainian Trident | 1992–2016 | 2 September 1996 | Not issued since 1 July 2018. 1, 2, and 5-kopiyka coins withdrew from general circulation on 1 October 2019. |
| | | 2 kopiyky | 17.30 mm | 0.64 g (1992~1996); 1.8 g (2001–) | aluminium (1992–1996), stainless steel (2001–) | Plain | Value, Ornaments | Ukrainian Trident | 1992–2014 | 2 September 1996 | Not issued since 1 July 2018. 1, 2, and 5-kopiyka coins withdrew from general circulation on 1 October 2019. |
| | | 5 kopiyok | 24 mm | 4.3 g | stainless steel | Reeded | Value, Ornaments | Ukrainian Trident | 1992–2015 | 2 September 1996 | Not issued since 1 July 2018. 1, 2, and 5-kopiyka coins withdrew from general circulation on 1 October 2019. |
| | | 10 kopiyok | 16.3 mm | 1.7 g | brass (1992–1996), aluminium bronze (2001–2012), brass-plated steel (2013–) | Reeded | Value, Ornaments | Ukrainian Trident | 1992~2022 | 2 September 1996 | 10-kopiyka coins withdrew from general circulation on 1 October 2025. |
| | | 25 kopiyok | 20.8 mm | 2.9 g | brass (1992–1996), aluminium bronze (2001–2012), brass-plated steel (2013–) | Reeded and plain sectors | Value, Ornaments | Ukrainian Trident | 1992–2016 | 2 September 1996 | Not issued since 1 July 2018. 25-kopiyka coin ceased to be legal tender in Ukraine and gone out of circulation, effective 1 October 2020. |
| | | 50 kopiyok | 23 mm | 4.2 g | brass (1992–1996), aluminium bronze (2001–2012), brass-plated steel (2013–) | Reeded and plain sectors | Value, Ornaments | Ukrainian Trident | 1992~present | 2 September 1996 | Current |
| | | 1 hryvnia | 26 mm | 7.1 g (1995,1996); 6.9 g (2001–) | brass (1995,1996), aluminium bronze (2001–) | Inscription: "ОДНА ГРИВНЯ", minted year | Value, Ornaments | Ukrainian Trident | 1992~2018 | 12 March 1997 | Current (new design introduced in 2018) |
| | | 1 hryvnia | 26 mm | 6.8 g (2004-2016) | aluminium bronze (2004-2016) | Plain with incuse lettering ("ОДНА · ГРИВНЯ · Date of issue") | Inscription: Coat of arms of Ukraine; УКРАЇНА 1 ГРИВНЯ; date of issue inside a decorative wreath | Half length figure of Volodymyr the Great holding a model church and staff with legend above | 2004-2016 | 2004 | Current (new design introduced in 2018) |
| | | 1 hryvnia | 18.9 mm | 3.3 g | Nickel-plated steel | Reeded | Coat of Arms of Ukraine, Value, Ornaments | Volodymyr the Great | 2018 | | Current |
| | | 2 hryvni | 20.2 mm | 4.0 g | Nickel-plated steel | Reeded | Coat of Arms of Ukraine, Value, Ornaments | Yaroslav the Wise | 2018 | | Current |
| | | 5 hryven | 22.1 mm | 5.2 g | Nickel-plated zinc | Segmented (Plain and Reeded edges) | Coat of Arms of Ukraine, Value, Ornaments | Bohdan Khmelnytsky | 2019 | | Current |
| | | 10 hryven | 23.5 mm | 6.4 g | Nickel-plated zinc | Reeded | Coat of Arms of Ukraine, Value, Ornaments | Ivan Mazepa | 2020 | | Current |
