= Kyiv City Teacher's House =

- Київський міський будинок учителя
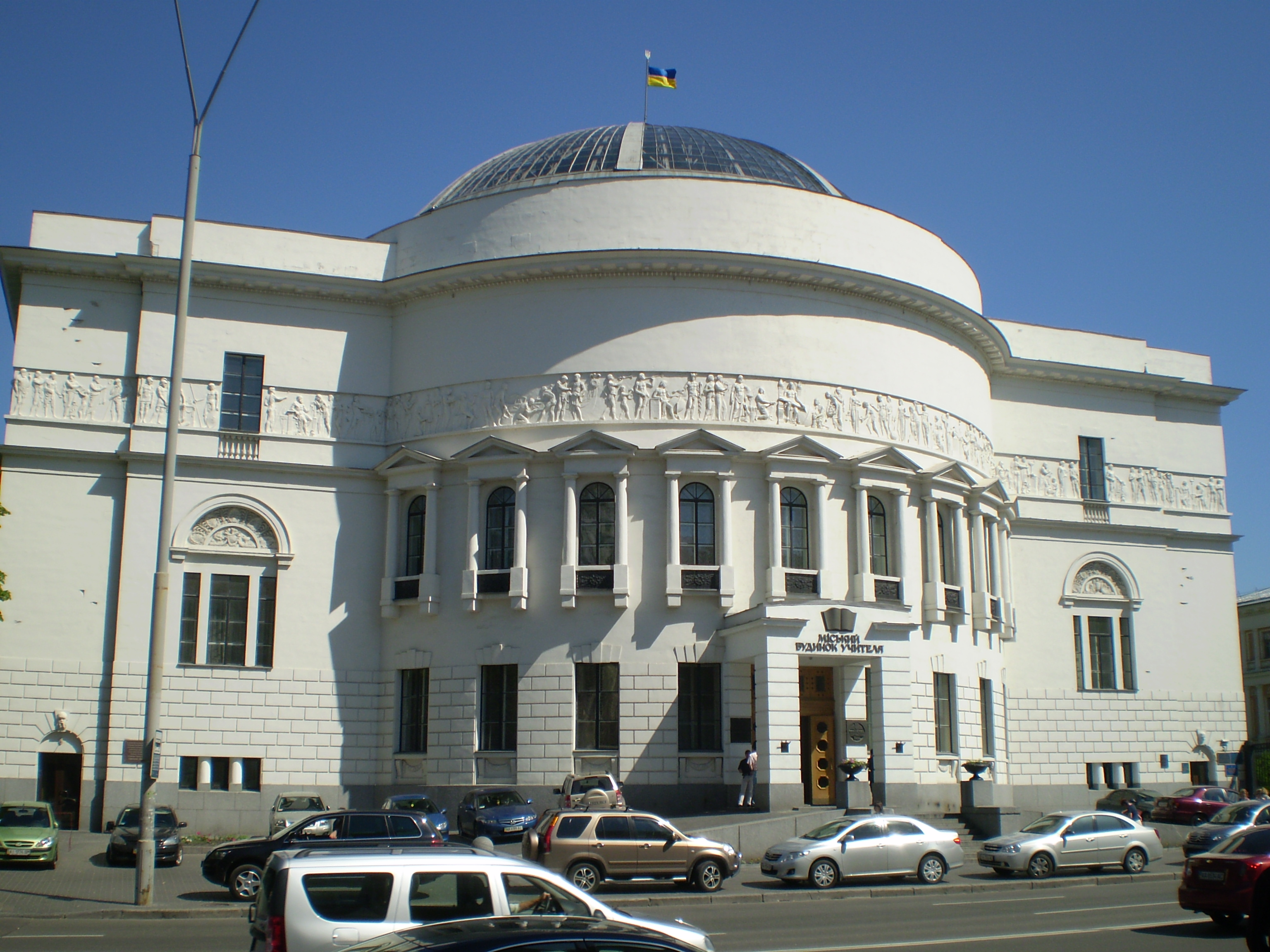

- Location within Ukraine

General information
- Location: Kyiv, Ukraine
- Coordinates: 50.444758°N 30.513512°E
- Opened: 1912

Design and construction
- Architect: Pavlo Alyoshyn

Immovable Monument of National Significance of Ukraine
- Official name: Будинок Педагогічного музею, в якому працювала Українська Центральна Рада (Building of the Pedagogical Museum, where the Ukrainian Central Rada worked)
- Type: History
- Reference no.: 260015-Н

Immovable Monument of National Significance of Ukraine
- Official name: Педагогічний музей (Pedagogical Museum)
- Type: Architecture
- Reference no.: 260114

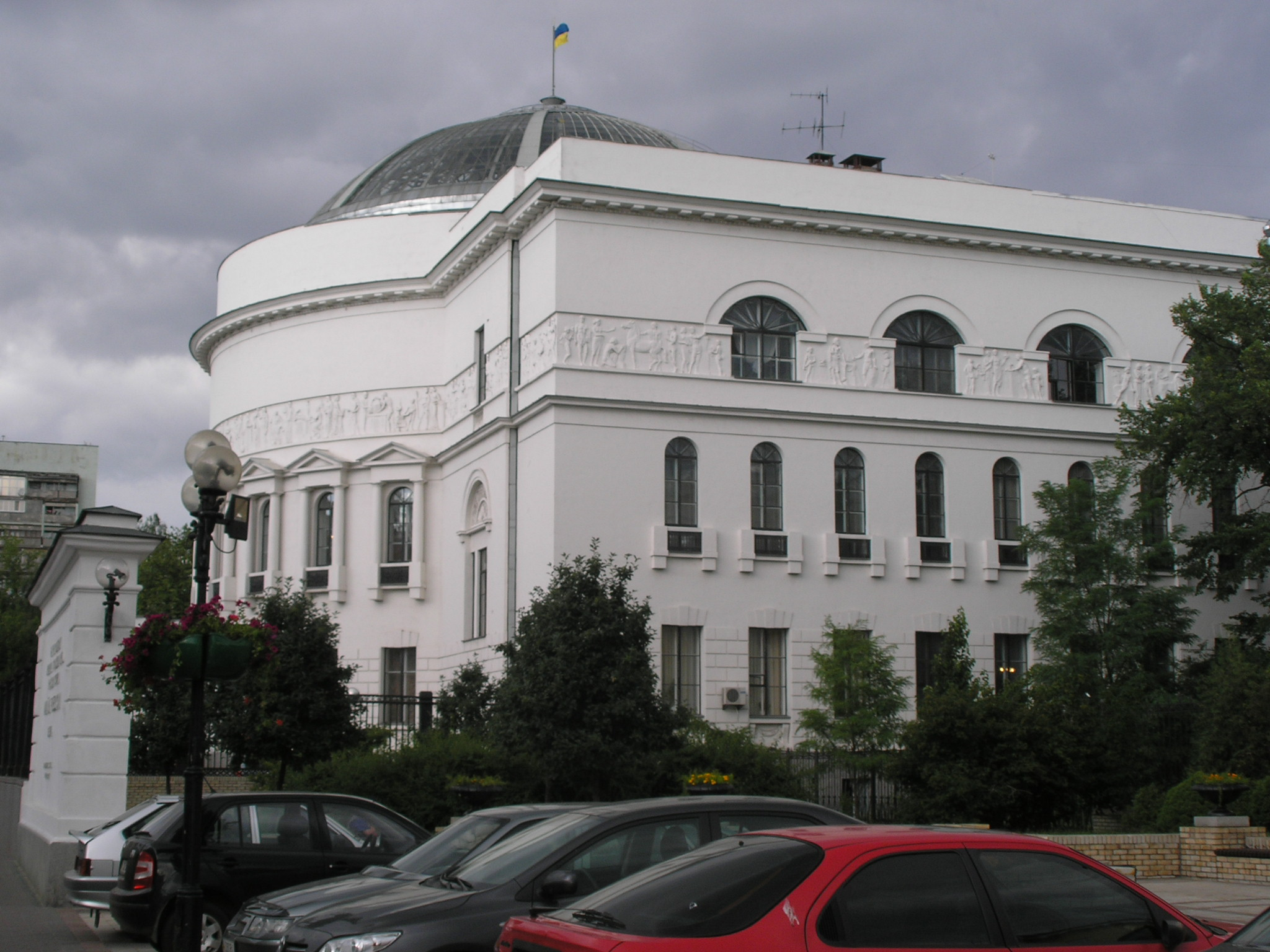
The meeting place of the Tsentralna Rada in Kyiv

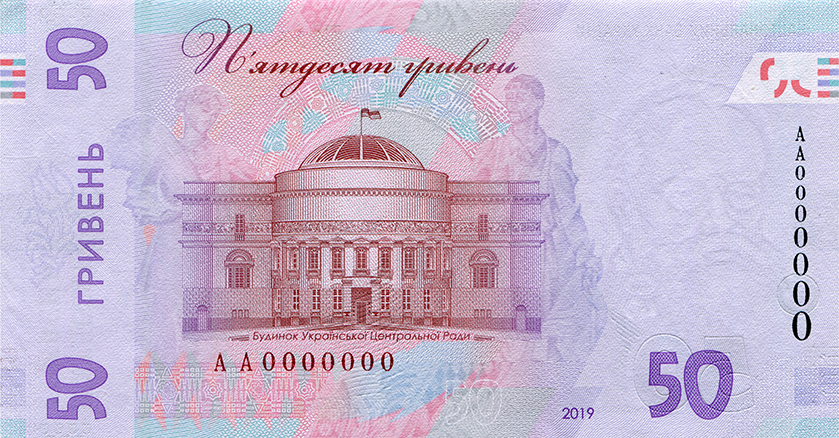
Teacher's House on the reverse of 50 hryvnias banknote

The Kyiv City Teacher's House (Ukrainian: Київський міський будинок учителя, romanized: Kyivskyi miskyi budynok uchytelia) also known as the Central Council House (Ukrainian: Будинок Центральної Ради, romanized: Budynok Tsentralnoi Rady) is a historical building located at 57 Volodymyrska Street, in Kyiv, Ukraine. The building is located next to the "Yellow Building" of Taras Shevchenko National University of Kyiv and the Presidium Building of National Academy of Sciences of Ukraine.

Currently, it is mainly occupied by the Ukrainian Trade Union of workers of Education and Science in Kyiv. It also houses the Pedagogical museum, the museum of the Ukrainian Revolution (1917-1920), the Sukhomlynsky State Pedagogical and Science Library, and the Cultural Center "Kyianochka". Both museums are located on the second floor.

The building was constructed during the Imperial era in 1909-1911 by Pavlo Alyoshyn.

== Scope ==
Originally, the building was built in 1912 for the Kyiv Pedagogical Museum that existed since 1901 and was located until 1913 in a building of the Kyiv National Academic Theatre of Operetta. In 1917 the museum was liquidated, and the building quartered the Central Council of Ukraine from March 17, 1917 until April 29, 1918. In August 1917 here took place All Ukrainian teachers Congresses and on 7 November 1917 here was established the Ukrainian Academy of Pedagogical Sciences. In December 1917 the building became a home of the Ukrainian Academy of Arts. In 1918-19 the building was occupied by the Directorate of Ukraine. After elimination of Ukrainian government from Kyiv in 1919, the building was used for various administrative institutions until 1925 when it was turned into the Museum of Revolution. In 1938 the building housed the Kyiv branch of Central Lenin Museum until 1982 (moved to the new Ukrainian House). In 1930s it somewhat changed its appearance and by the design of its original creator Pavlo Alyoshyn it was rebuilt.

The Pedagogical museum was revived in 1977 based on the Republican pedagogical exhibition that existed since 1948. In 1982 it finally returned to its original building and is located on the second floor at the south wing. The museum is administrated by the Academy of Pedagogical Sciences of Ukraine.

The building is a property of Kyiv City. Along with a few municipal offices located there, a part of the building is currently subleased for office space by a set of political, civil, and small business organizations.

== "Ukrainian Club" meeting place ==
The Ukrainian Club (Ukrainian: Український клуб, romanized: Ukrainskyi klub), was a union of national public figures of Ukraine headed by Mykola Lysenko. The club's meetings were attended by the Ukrainian writers Ivan Nechuy-Levytsky, Lesya Ukrainka, her mother Olena Pchilka, Maxim Rylsky - then a gymnasium pupil, and the actors Mariya Zankovetska and Mykola Sadovsky. In addition, Mykhailo Kotsiubynsky, Panas Myrny, and Ivan Franko visited the club during their stays in Kyiv.

In 1912, the Kyiv City Council had closed the Ukrainian Club, accusing it of subversive activity. But soon, another Ukrainian society, Rodyna, was arranged in the same building where the former Ukrainian Club met. When the city's administration gave permission to organize the Rodyna club, it was assumed that the stress mark was on the first syllable meant motherland, Rodina. However, the members of the club always called it Rodyna (translated as family in Ukrainian).

== Bibliography ==
- Malikenaite, Ruta (2003). Touring Kyiv. Baltia Druk. p. 50. ISBN 966-96041-3-3.
