= Vasyl Lopata =

Ukrainian artist and prose writer

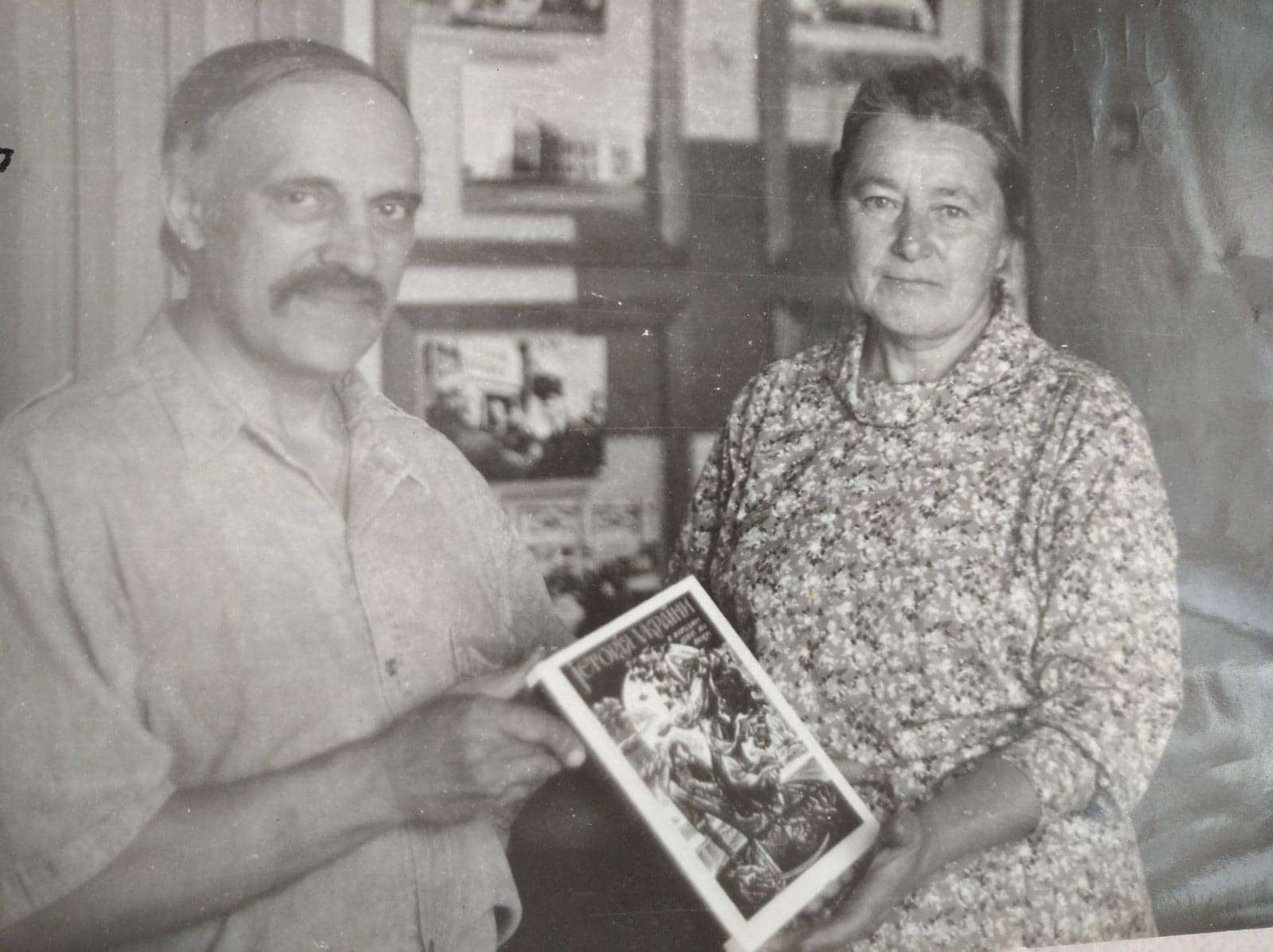
Vasyl Lopata donates his work to the National Museum of History and Local Lore in the village of Kozary, Nosivka Raion, Chernihiv Oblast. In this village, in the family of his brother Andriy their mother spent the last years of her life. On the right — the director and founder of the museum Lidiya Kharchenko.

Vasyl Ivanovych Lopata (Ukrainian: Лопата Василь Іванович; born in Nova Basan, Bobrovytsia Raion, Chernihiv Oblast, Ukraine, Ukrainian Soviet Socialist Republic, USSR, on April 28, 1941 — September 18, 2025) was a Ukrainian artist and prose writer. He was a member of the National Union of Artists of Ukraine (1971), National Union of Writers of Ukraine (2006). People's Painter of Ukraine (2001), laureate of Shevchenko National Prize (1993), Oles Honchar Literary Prize (2007), Lesya Ukrainka Literary and Art Prize (2008).

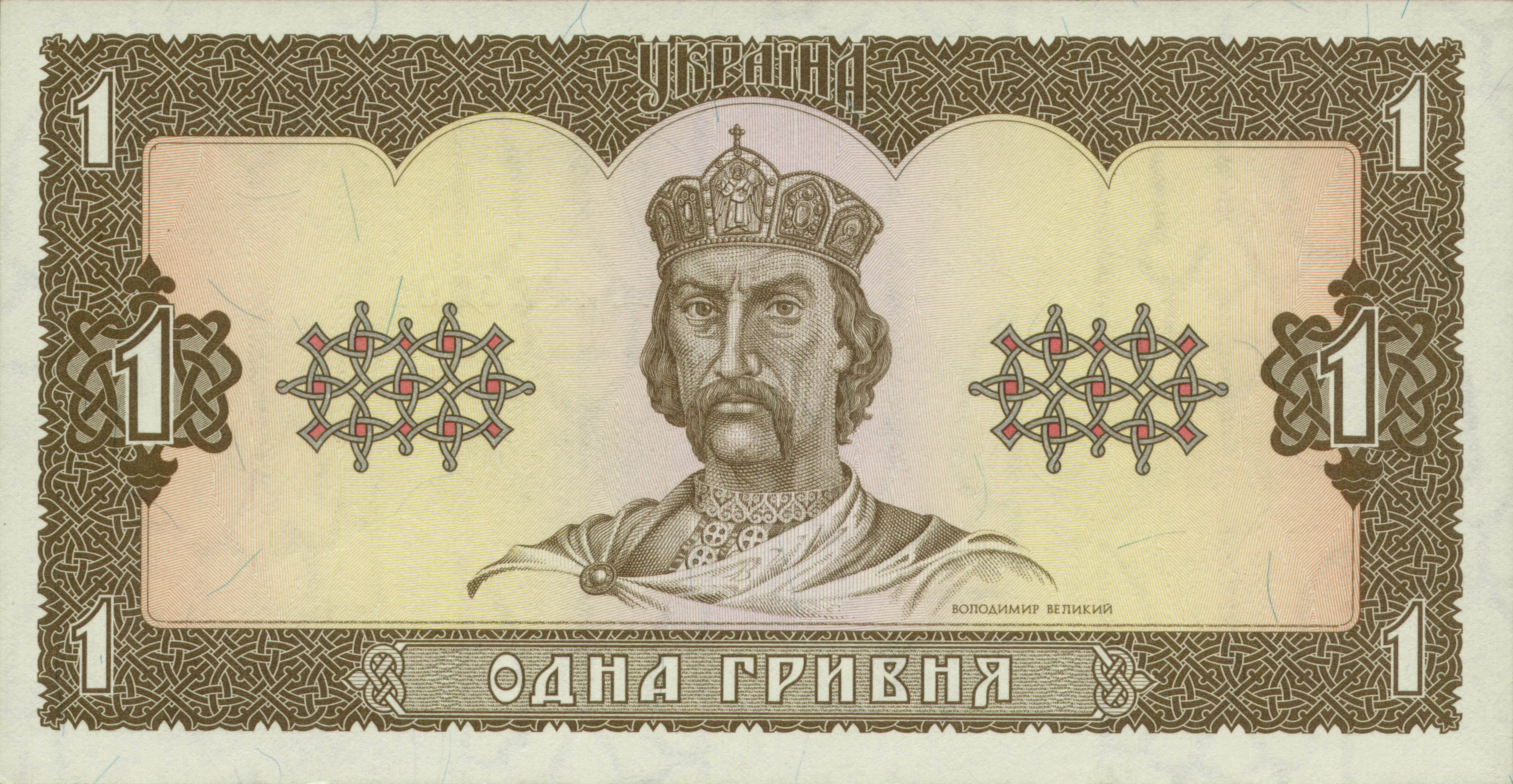
1 Hryvnia banknote, 1996

In collaboration with Borys Mykolayovych Maximov (Борис Миколайович Максимов), he designed the first Ukrainian hryvnia. As an artist, he worked principally in engraving and painting, also creating posters and ex-libris, among other things.
