= Staryi Maidan =

Village in Khmelnytskyi Oblast, Ukraine

Staryi Maidan Старий Майдан Starozakrevskyi Maidan
- Coordinates: 49°16′15″N 27°35′21″E
- Country: Ukraine
- Oblast: Khmelnytskyi Oblast
- Raion: Khmelnytskyi Raion
- Hromada: Vovkovyntsi urban hromada
- Established: 1600

Area
  - Total: 0.253 km^{2} (0.098 sq mi)
- Elevation: 330 m (1,080 ft)

Population
  - Total: 46
- Zip code: 32222
- Area code: +380 3856

Staryi Maidan (Ukrainian: Старий Майдан), formerly Starozakrevskyi Maidan until 1938 (Старозакревський Майдан, literally "Old Zakrevsky Maidan", maidan meaning "public square"), is a village located between Derazhnia and Vovkovyntsi, in Khmelnytskyi Raion of Khmelnytskyi Oblast near Kalna in the Podolia region of Ukraine. It belongs to Vovkovyntsi urban hromada, one of the hromadas of Ukraine. It was a Jewish agricultural colony established in 1844, but today is mostly populated by ethnic Ukrainians.

== History ==
It was the largest and most prosperous agricultural colony near Derazhnia, at one point in the late 19th century it had a population of over 700. The colony continued until it was turned into a kolkhoz and renamed Staryi Maidan by the Soviets in 1928. It was nicknamed "Yiddish Maidan" by its residents, primarily to distinguish it from the nearby village of Novyi Maidan ("New Maidan").

Due to periodic pogroms and to impoverished conditions in the first two decades of the 20th century, many residents emigrated to the United States (and some to Israel). Those who settled in America formed a burial society, Yiddish Meidan Verein, purchased a plot in Beth David Cemetery in Elmont, New York, where many of the early immigrants are buried. In 1941, the remaining residents of Staryi Maidan were moved to the Derazhnia ghetto and eventually shot to death by the Nazis.

Until 18 July 2020, Staryi Maidan belonged to Derazhnia Raion. The raion was abolished in July 2020 as part of the administrative reform of Ukraine, which reduced the number of raions of Khmelnytskyi Oblast to three. The area of Derazhnia Raion was merged into Khmelnytskyi Raion.

== Bibliography ==
- Chapin, David A. and Weinstock, Ben, The Road from Letichev: The history and culture of a forgotten Jewish community in Eastern Europe, Volume 1. ISBN 0-595-00666-3 iUniverse, Lincoln, NE, 2000. (Chapter 9 "The Jewish Farmers of Podolia" provides a very detailed history of the colony.)
- Chapin, David A. and Weinstock, Ben, The Road from Letichev: The history and culture of a forgotten Jewish community in Eastern Europe, Volume 2. ISBN 0-595-00667-1 iUniverse, Lincoln, NE, 2000.
