= Letychiv Raion =

Former subdivision of Khmelnytskyi Oblast, Ukraine

Letychiv Raion Летичівський район
- Raion
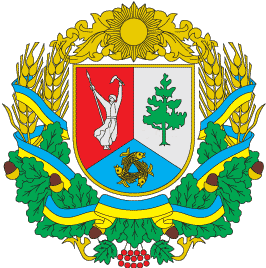
- Flag Coat of arms

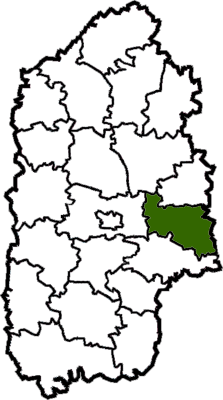
- Coordinates: 49°27′10″N 27°35′26″E
- Country: Ukraine
- Region: Khmelnytskyi Oblast
- Established: 7 March 1923
- Disestablished: 18 July 2020
- Admin. center: Letychiv
- Subdivisions: List: 0 — city councils; 2 — settlement councils; 19 — rural councils; Number of localities: 0 — cities; 2 — urban-type settlements; 55 — villages; 0 — rural settlements

Government
  - Governor: Vitaliy Tymchak (PR)

Area
  - Total: 951 km^{2} (367 sq mi)

Population (2020)
  - Total: 26,490 ▼
  - Density: 27.9/km^{2} (72.1/sq mi)
- Time zone: UTC+02:00 (EET)
  - Summer (DST): UTC+03:00 (EEST)
- Postal index: 31500—31554
- Area code: +380 3857
- Website: https://web.archive.org/web/20120520062359/http://www.letadm.km.ua/

Letychiv Raion (Ukrainian: Летичівський район, Letychivs'kyi raion) was one of the 20 administrative raions (a district) of Khmelnytskyi Oblast in western Ukraine. Its administrative center was located in the urban-type settlement of Letychiv. Its population was 34,588 as of the 2001 Ukrainian Census. The raion was abolished on 18 July 2020 as part of the administrative reform of Ukraine, which reduced the number of raions of Khmelnytskyi Oblast to three. The area of Letychiv Raion was merged into Khmelnytskyi Raion. The last estimate of the raion population was 26,490 (2020 est.)

== Geography ==
Letychiv Raion was located in the eastern part of the Khmelnytskyi Oblast, corresponding to the modern-day boundaries of the Volhynia and Podolia historical regions. One of the main rivers that ran through the raion was the Southern Bug. To its east, it bordered upon Lityn Raion of Vinnytsia Oblast.

== History ==
Letychiv Raion was established on March 7, 1923 as part of a full-scale administrative reorganization of the Ukrainian Soviet Socialist Republic. It was established along with Medzhybizh Raion, both of which compromise Letychiv Raion's current territorial boundaries.

In 1959, the raion's territory was expanded with the annexation of Derazhnia Raion, Stara Syniava Raion, and Medzhybizh Raios. In 1967, Derazhnia and Stara Syniava Raions were separated from the Letychiv Raion, leaving it with its current boundaries.

== Subdivisions ==
At the time of disestablishment, the raion consisted of two hromadas:

- Letychiv settlement hromada with the administration in Letychiv;
- Medzhybizh settlement hromada with the administration in the urban-type settlement of Medzhybizh.

Letychiv Raion was divided in a way that follows the general administrative scheme in Ukraine. Local government was also organized along a similar scheme nationwide. Consequently, raions were subdivided into councils, which were the prime level of administrative division in the country.

Each of the raion's urban localities administered their own councils, often containing a few other villages within its jurisdiction. However, only a handful of rural localities were organized into councils, which also might contain a few villages within its jurisdiction.

Accordingly, the Letychiv Raion was divided into:

- 1 settlement council—made up of the urban-type settlement of Letychiv (administrative center) and Medzhybizh
- 19 village councils

Overall, the raion had a total of 57 populated localities, consisting of two urban-type settlements, and 55 villages.

== Places of interest ==
- Letychiv Fortress
- Medzhybizh Fortress

== Notable residents ==
- Zośka Vieras (1892, Medzhybizh village – 1991), Belarusian writer and one of the initiators and active participants of the Belarusian national revival
