= Letychiv =

Rural locality in Khmelnytskyi Oblast, Ukraine

Letychiv Летичів
- Rural settlement
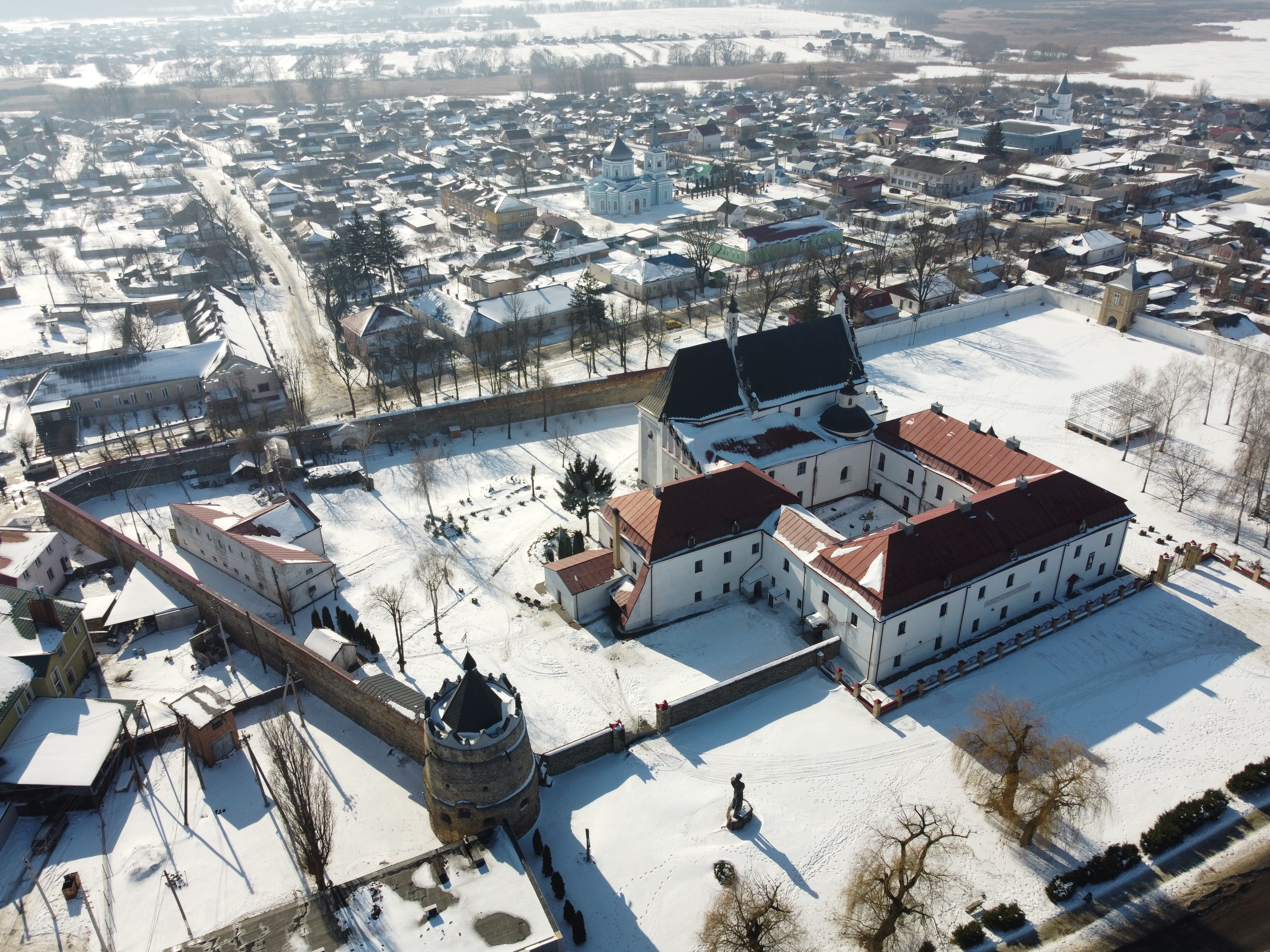
- Aerial view of Letychiv Castle and Dominican convent

- Coat of arms
- Interactive map of Letychiv
- Location within Khmelnytskyi Oblast Location within Ukraine
- Coordinates: 49.38°N 27.62°E
- Country: Ukraine
- Oblast: Khmelnytskyi Oblast
- Raion: Khmelnytskyi Raion
- Hromada: Letychiv settlement hromada

Area
  - Total: 11.42 km^{2} (4.41 sq mi)
- Elevation: 274 m (899 ft)

Population (2022)
  - Total: 10,074
  - Density: 882.1/km^{2} (2,285/sq mi)
- Time zone: UTC+2 (EET)
  - Summer (DST): UTC+3 (EEST)
- Postal Code: 31500
- Area code: +380 3857
- KOATUU: 6823055100

Letychiv (Ukrainian: Летичів; Yiddish: לעטיטשעוו, romanized: Letichev; Polish: Latyczów) is a rural settlement in Khmelnytskyi Raion, Khmelnytskyi Oblast, western Ukraine. It is located 51 kilometres (32 mi) from Khmelnytskyi and 33 kilometres (21 mi) from the railway station in Derazhnia. It hosts the administration of Letychiv settlement hromada, one of the hromadas of Ukraine. Its population according to the 2001 census was 11,081 inhabitants. Current population: 10,074 (2022 estimate).

There are brickworks, dairy, plant of construction material in the town. The town is located between Khmelnitskyi and Vinnytsia, at the confluence of the Vovk and the Southern Bug rivers.

== Name ==
In addition to the Ukrainian Летичів (Letychiv), in other languages the name of the city is Polish: Latyczów, Yiddish: לעטיטשעוו, romanized: Letichev, and Russian: Летичев.

== History ==
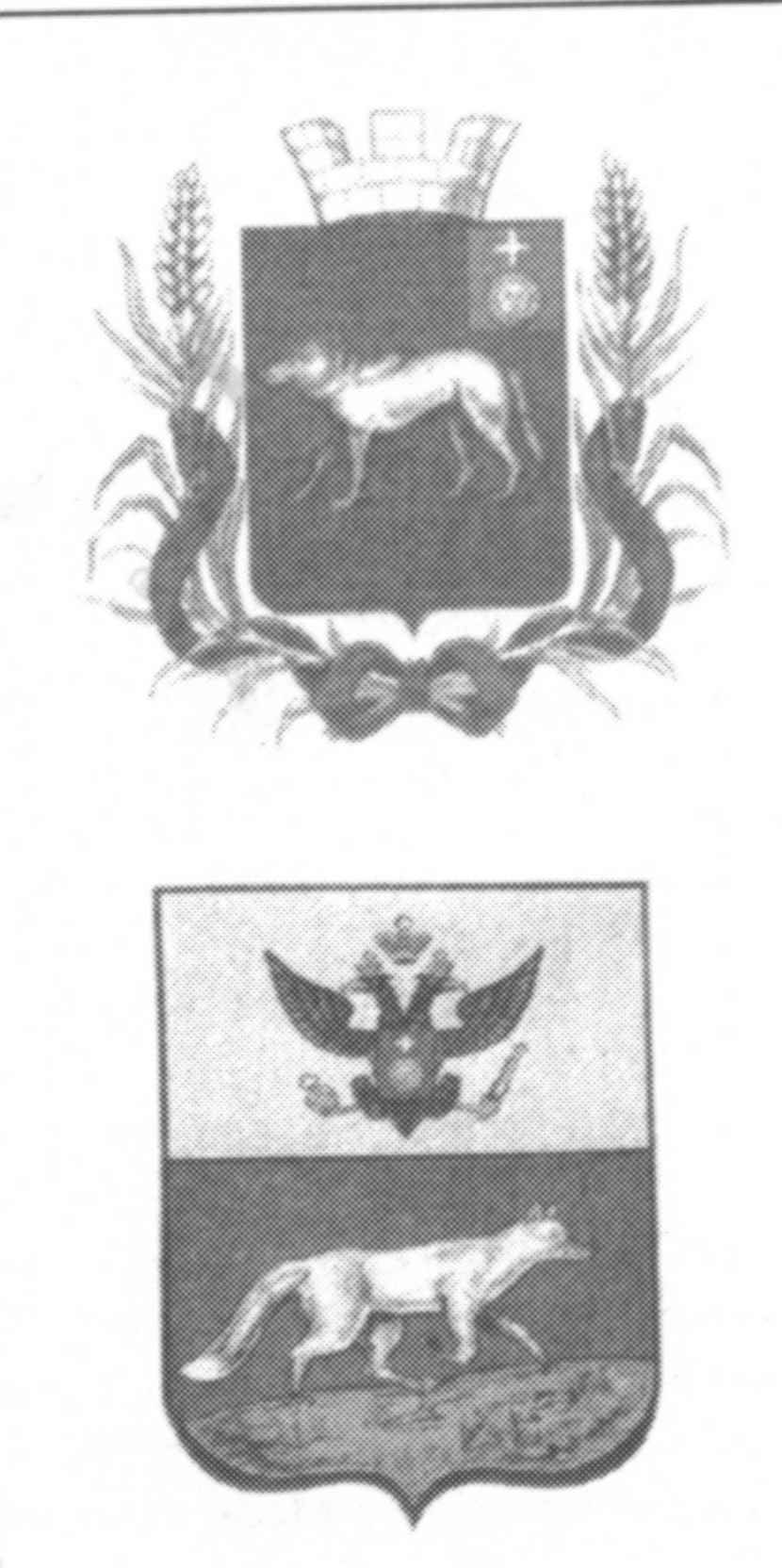
Letychiv Coats of Arms: Top is the Polish original from 1569, and bottom is from 1792 during the Russian Imperial era

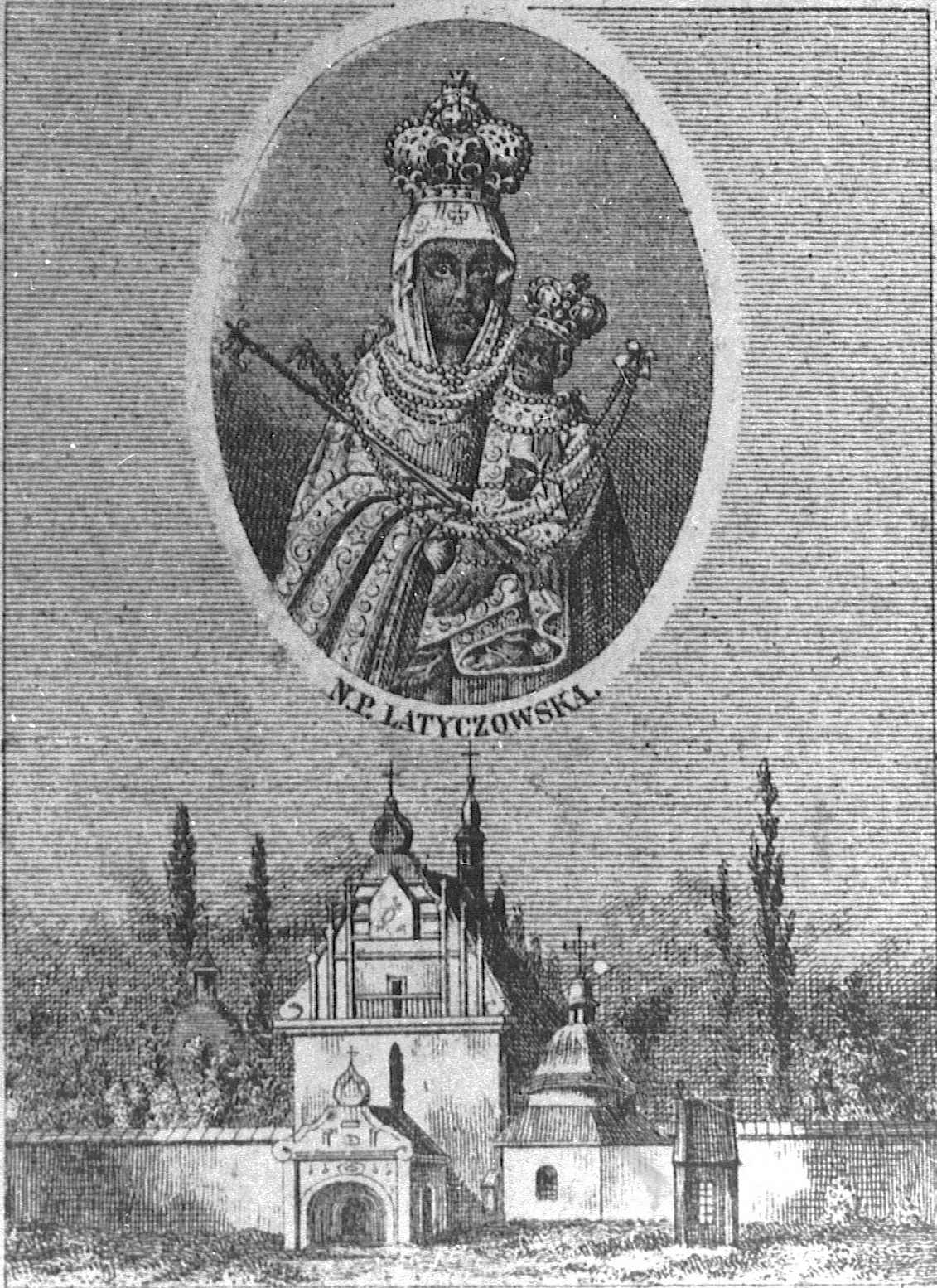
Letychiv Assumption Church: Top is the Letychiv Icon, and bottom is the facade of the church

Founded in 1362. First historical mention is in connection with the Tatar invasions of 1411. It is mentioned first as a palisade fortress, then as a settlement under Magdeburg law in 1429. Even with natural moats on all sides, Letychiv did not have the topographic relief that blesses other Podolia Province strongholds (such as Medzhibozh or Kamenets Podilsky). Thus, Letychiv was more easily attacked and harder to defend. Because of this, until Russian times Letychiv played a subordinate role to nearby Medzhibozh.

Dominican friars brought an icon of Mary, mother of Jesus to Letychiv in the late 15th century. Letychiv suffered the Tatar invasions of Poland in 1453, 1516, 1558, and 1567.

In 1546, the first Assumption church was built. In 1569, king Stefan Batory presented Letychiv with its first coat of arms. It shows a wolf, representing the river Volk.

In 1598 Jan Potocki replaced the town's weaker wooden fortifications with extensive stone fortifications, known as the Letychiv Fortress. Very little of these survive today, with the exception of one tower and the adjacent walls around the Assumption Church (rebuilt by Potocki in 1605).

Letychiv suffered deprivations from Bohdan Khmelnytsky's cossack uprising in 1648. During this time, Letychiv's icon was removed from the Assumption Church for safekeeping in Lviv. Weakened by the cossack uprising, Podolia was invaded and occupied by Turkey in 1672. Letychiv became part of the Turkish Ejalet of Kamieniecki. In 1682, Letychiv was recaptured by the Poles under king John III Sobieski. However, Poland did not regain full control until 1699 because the town was frequently ravaged by ongoing struggles between the Poles and Turks. The icon was returned to Letychiv in 1723. In 1778, Pope Clement XIV ordered that a special crown from Rome be installed on the icon. Letychiv continued to be attacked by cossacks and Haidamaks in 1702, 1734, 1737, 1749, 1750, 1755, 1768, and 1777.

In the 18th century, Letychiv had grown to be the second largest town in Podolia, Medzhibozh being the largest. The first Jews in Letychiv are reported in stories within Shivhei haBesht (stories about the Baal Shem Tov) that probably date from about 1750. By the 1780s there were approximately 800 Jews living in the town. Letychiv passed into Russian hands during the second partition of Poland in 1793. At that time, the Russian administrative center of this region moved from Medzhibozh to Letychiv. The population soon exploded and reached its peak in the late 19th century. Approximately 4,100 Jews lived here in 1897, about 60% of the population. In 1882 Letichiv was the scene of a notorious pogrom against Jews that resulted in a sensational trial of the pogromists.

After the 1917 Bolshevik Revolution, the territory was occupied by German and Hungarian troops until the end of World War I. Letychev was the scene of numerous pogroms during the Ukrainian Civil War of 1919-1922. The town changed hands many times as different militia units from either the Bolsheviks, Ukrainian Nationalists, Poles, or Whites gained temporary control. What little wealth was left was stripped in these pogroms turning the entire area into ruins.

Under Soviet rule starting 1922, the region's economy improved. Electricity, schools, roads and other infrastructure were built. Several kolkhozes (collective farms) were established nearby. In the early 1930s, pressure from the government to collectivize resulted in severe food shortages that resulted in famines throughout Ukraine.

In World War II, Letichiv fell to German forces during Operation Barbarossa on July 17, 1941 after heavy fighting. In that action, retreating Soviet troops blew up the dam over the river Volk over which carried the main east-west road. This temporarily stopped the German advance for nine days until the position could be outflanked from the south. It remained in German hands until it was liberated by Soviet troops on March 23, 1944.

Letychiv was astride an important east-west supply road that the German government wanted to expand into a highway. This road linked the city of Proskuriv and routes westward into Germany and the city of Vinnytsia with routes to the eastern front. Vinnytsia was the site of Hitler's headquarters bunker in Soviet territory where he personally directed the war between 1942 and 1943.

A Jewish ghetto and a separate slave labor camp within Letychiv Castle was established in Letychiv to assist Organisation Todt in providing human labor for the road building project. Because of this special road project, Letychiv retained its Jews longer than most of the surrounding communities, where Einsatzgruppen units executed entire populations of Jews shortly after German occupation. However, when the road project was completed in the summer of 1942, the Einsatzgruppen units were called in. Three separate mass shootings of Jews occurred in September 1942 where 3,000 Jews were killed (half the ghetto), in November 1942 where 4,000 Jews were killed (the remainder of the ghetto), and in November 1943 where the remaining 200 Jews in the slave labor camp were shot. That eliminated all Jews from the town. Soviet authorities reported that a total of 7,200 Jews were murdered in a ravine in Zaletichevka, just south of town.

Until 18 July 2020, Letychiv was the administrative center of Letychiv Raion. The raion was abolished in July 2020 as part of the administrative reform of Ukraine, which reduced the number of raions of Khmelnytskyi Oblast to three. The area of Letychiv Raion was merged into Khmelnytskyi Raion.

Until 26 January 2024, Letychiv was designated urban-type settlement. On this day, a new law entered into force which abolished this status, and Letychiv became a rural settlement.

== Population ==
=== Language ===
Distribution of the population by native language according to the 2001 census:

Language	Percentage
Ukrainian	97.4%
Russian	2%
other/undecided	0.6%

== Notable people ==
- Ustym Karmaliuk (1787–1835), a notorious thief and gang leader, is considered a Ukrainian Robin Hood and folk hero. He principally robbed from rich nobles and distributed the wealth to peasants. He is buried in the Letychiv Cemetery. A statue to his memory is located there.
- Mykola Burachek (1871-1942), Ukrainian painter
- Oscar Williams (1900–1964), American poet, was born in Letychiv to Jewish parents.
- Joseph "Doc" Stacher (1902–1977), from the Letychiv Oystacher family, was a notorious Jewish crime boss who immigrated to the U.S. and later to Israel. He had close connections with the Jewish Mafia of Meyer Lansky and Bugsy Siegel (whose parents Max Siegel and Jennie Goldstein Siegel came from Letychiv).

== Gallery ==
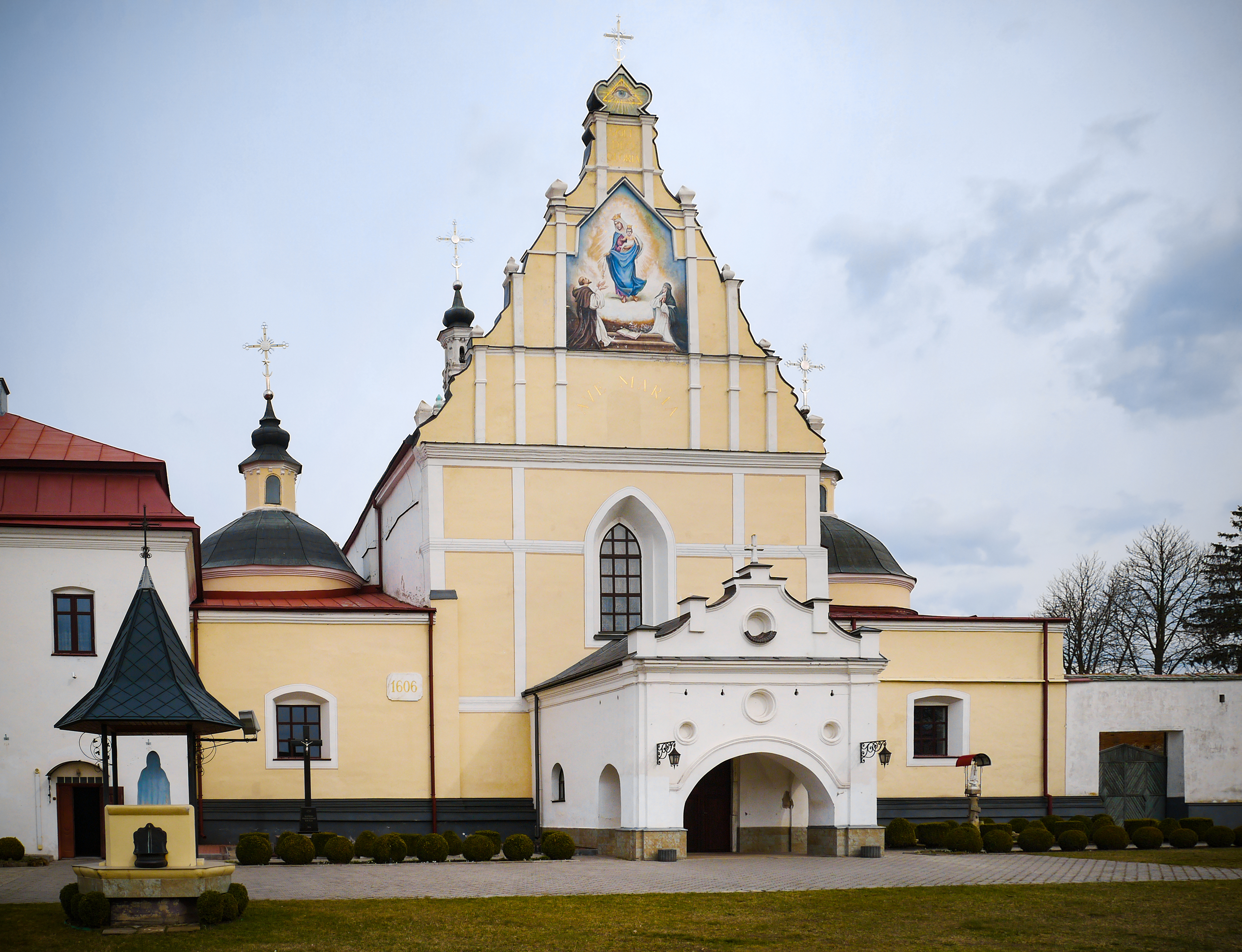
Dominican convent in Letychiv

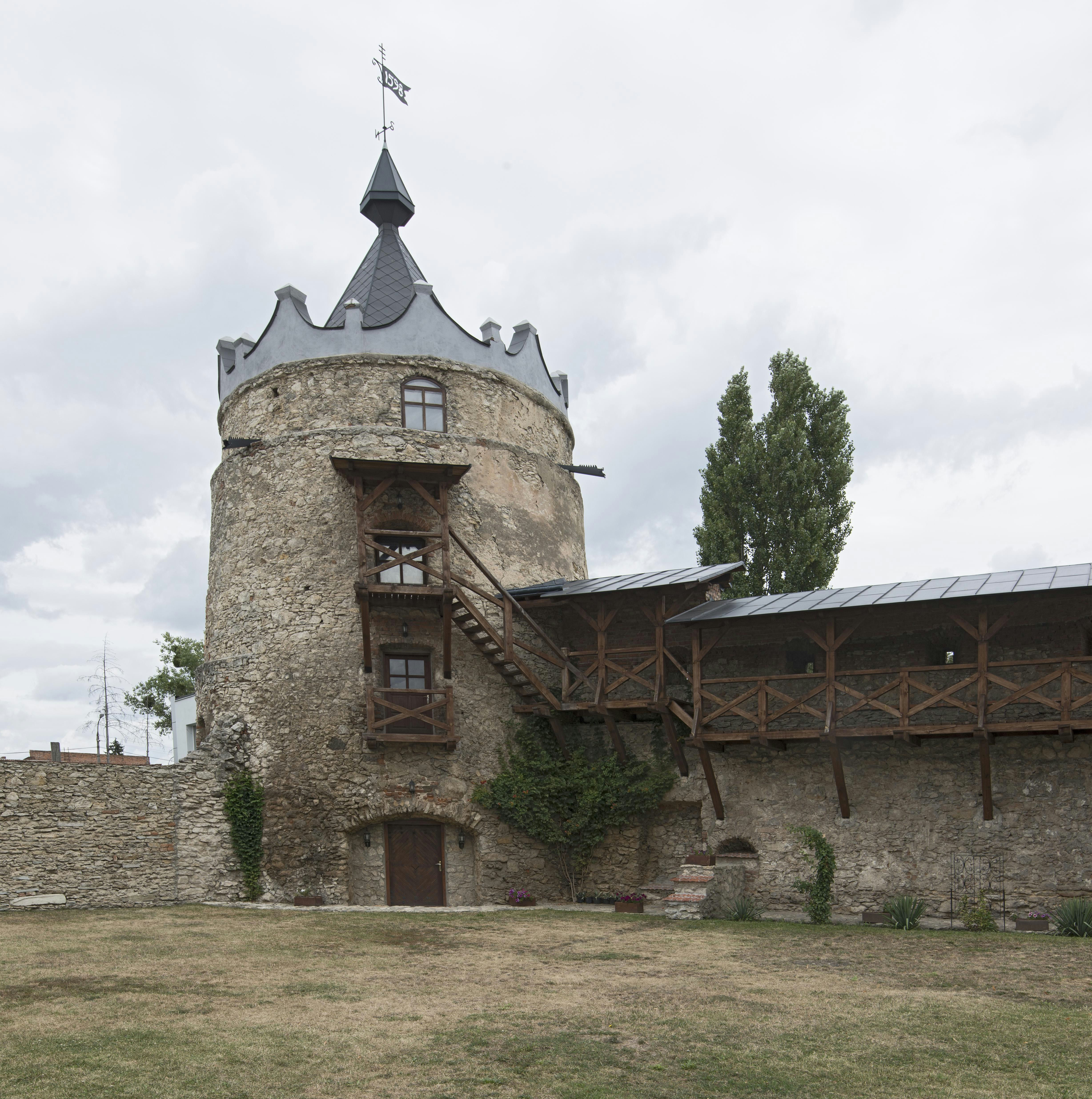
Letychiv Castle

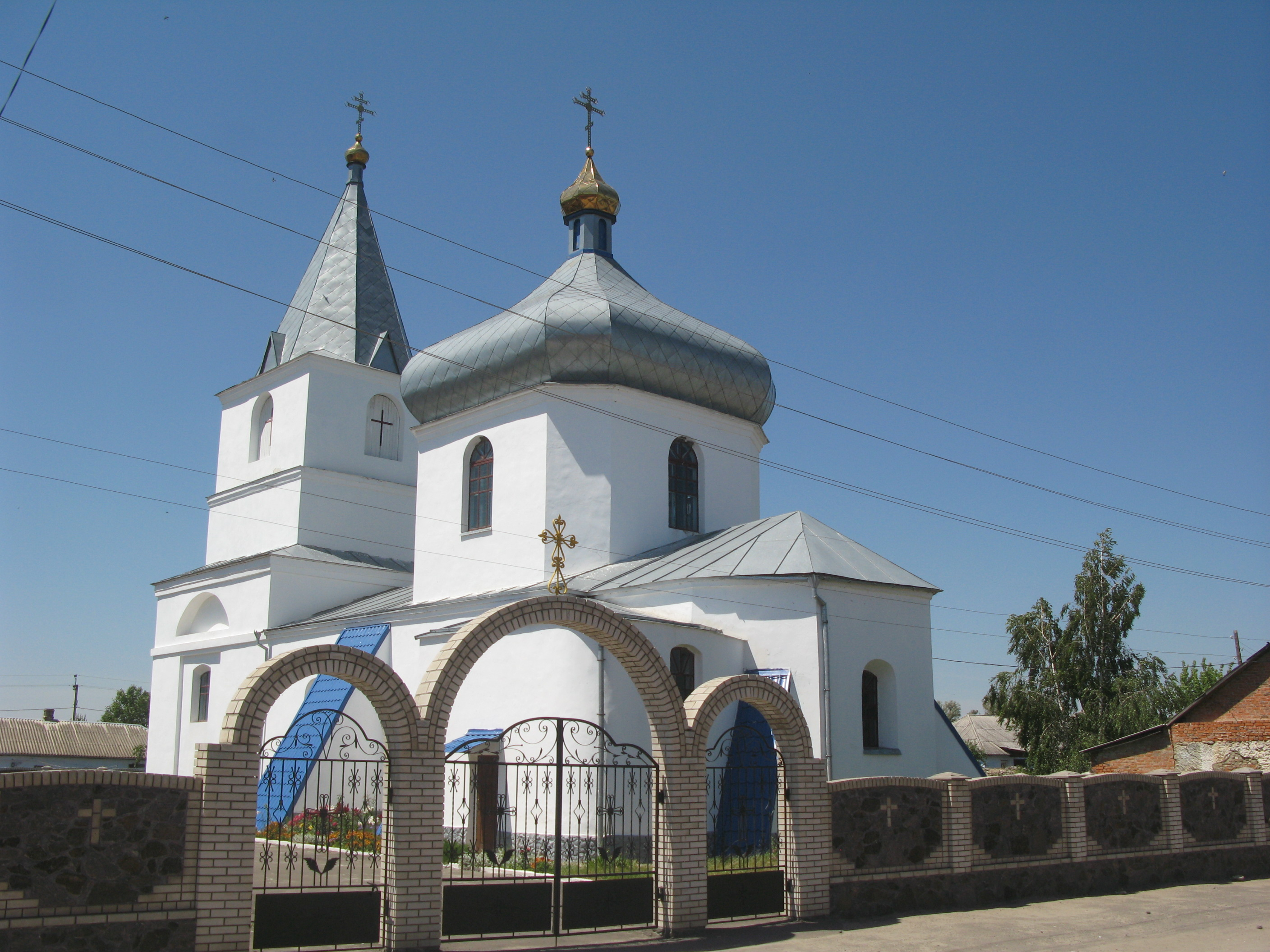
St. Michael's Church

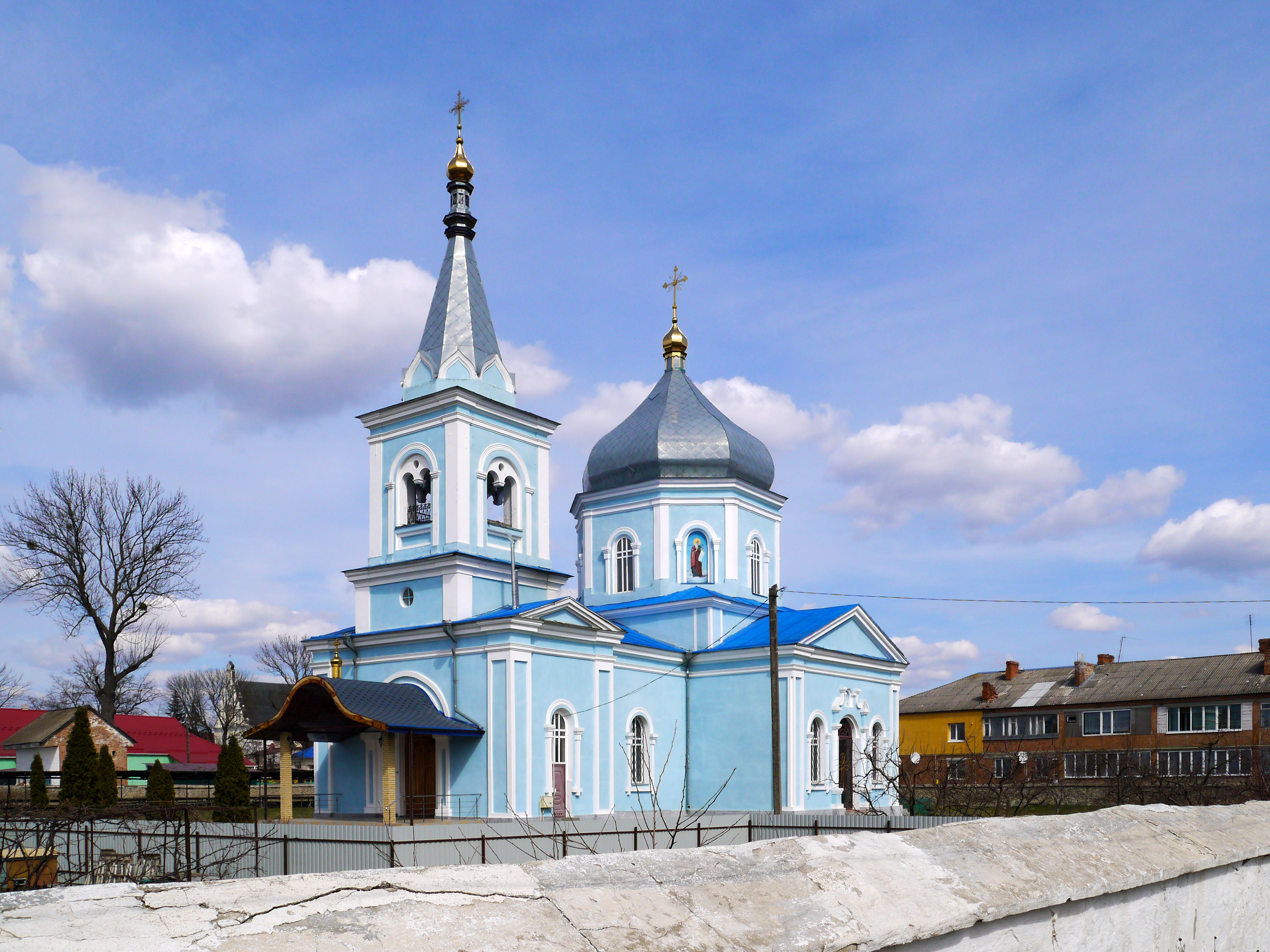
Assumption Church

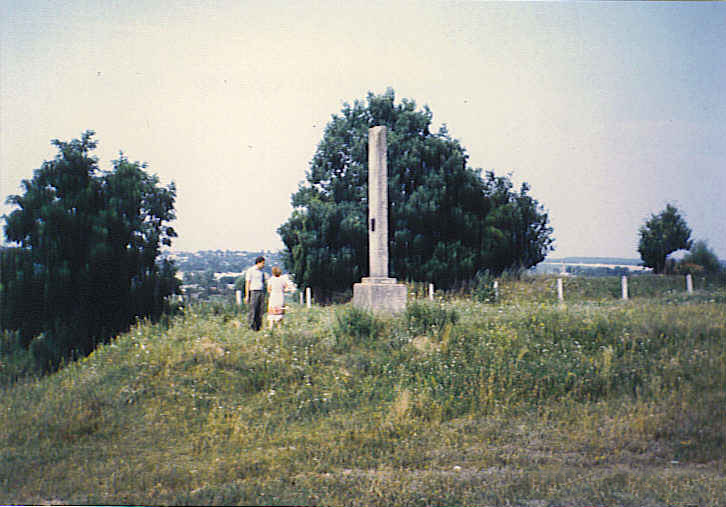
During World War II, Nazis murdered approximately 7,500 Jews in Letichiv at this location

== Bibliography ==
- Chapin, David A. and Weinstock, Ben, The Road from Letichev: The history and culture of a forgotten Jewish community in Eastern Europe, Volume 1. ISBN 0-595-00666-3 iUniverse, Lincoln, NE, 2000.
- Chapin, David A. and Weinstock, Ben, The Road from Letichev: The history and culture of a forgotten Jewish community in Eastern Europe, Volume 2. ISBN 0-595-00667-1 iUniverse, Lincoln, NE, 2000.
