= Derazhnia =

City in Khmelnytskyi Oblast, Ukraine

Coordinates: 49°16′N 27°26′E

Derazhnia Деражня
- City
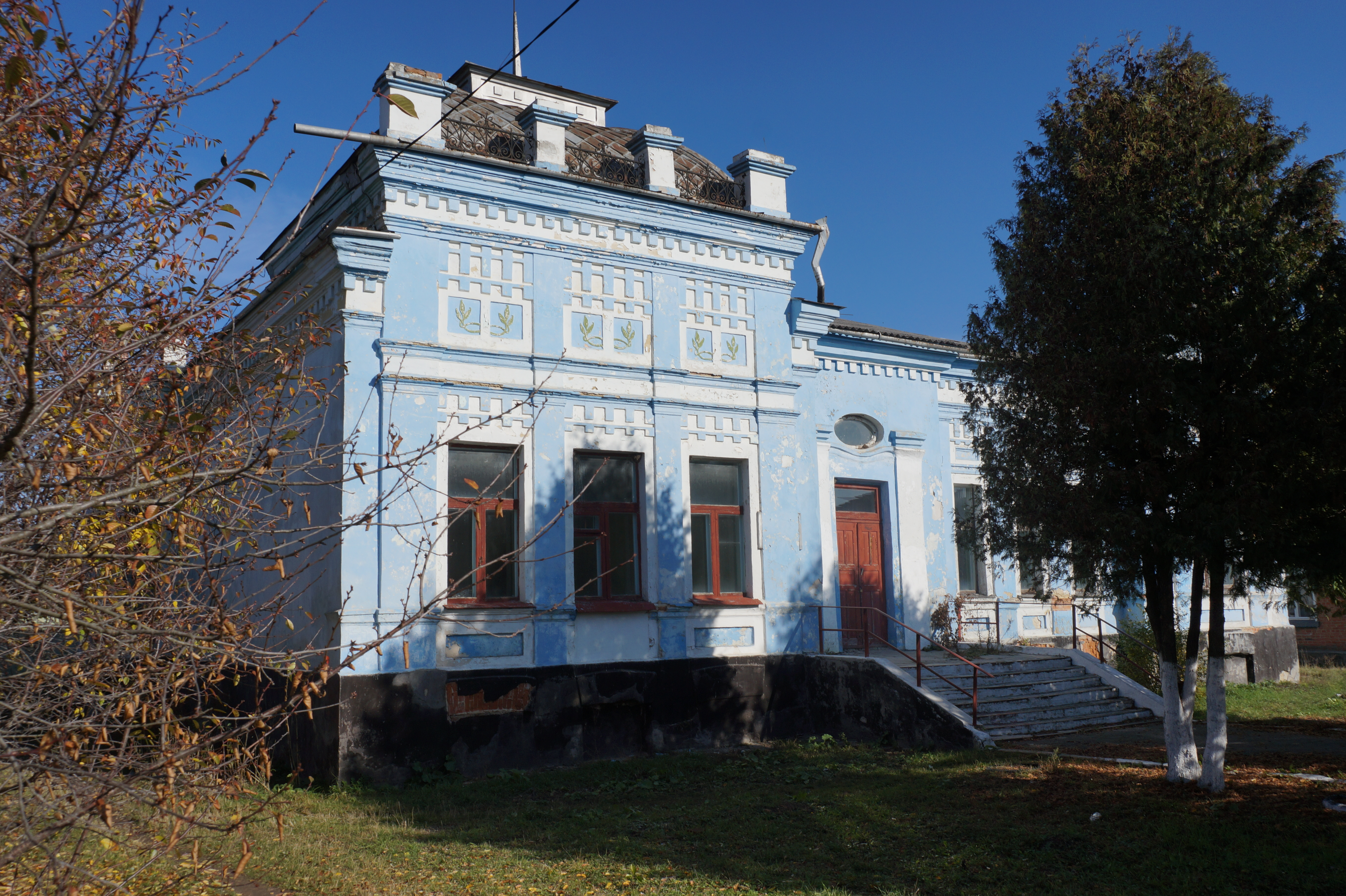
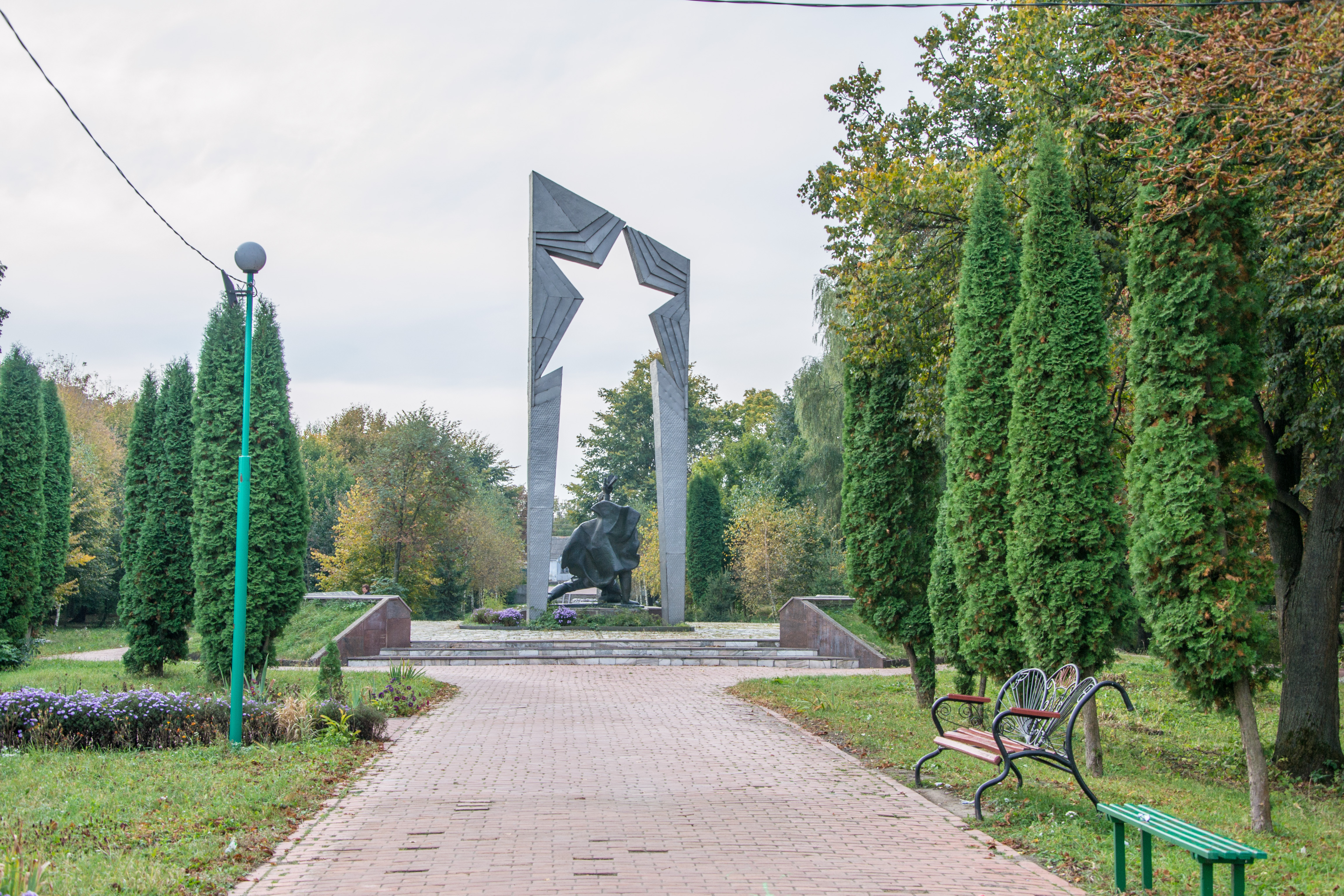
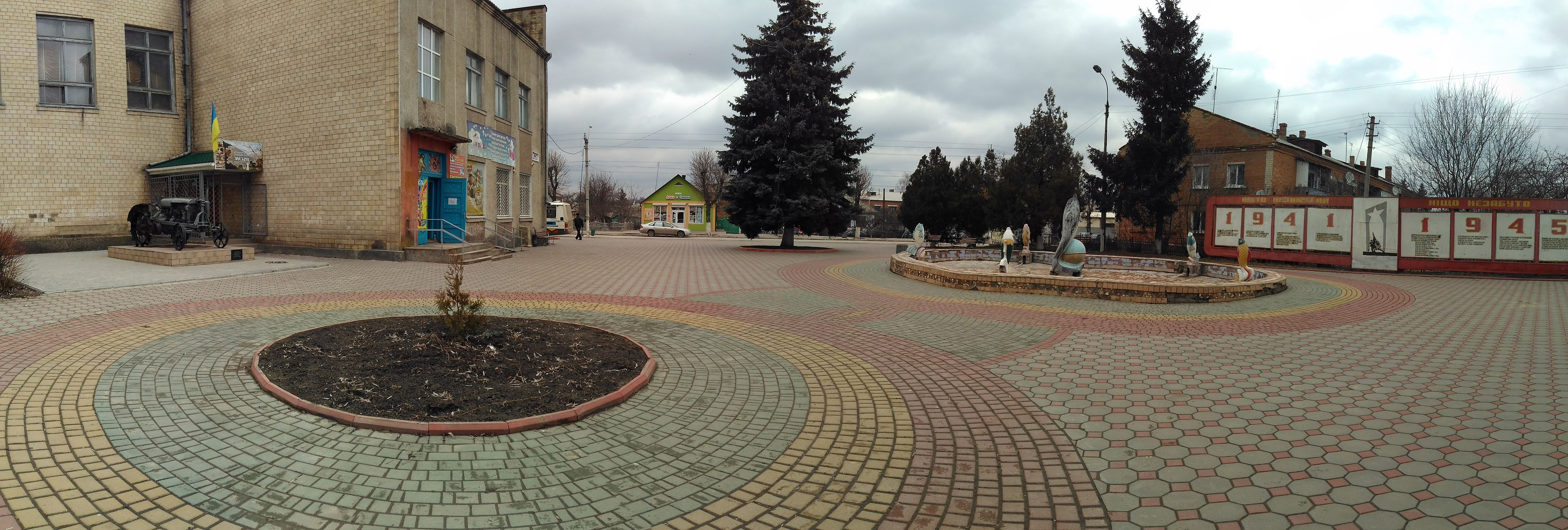
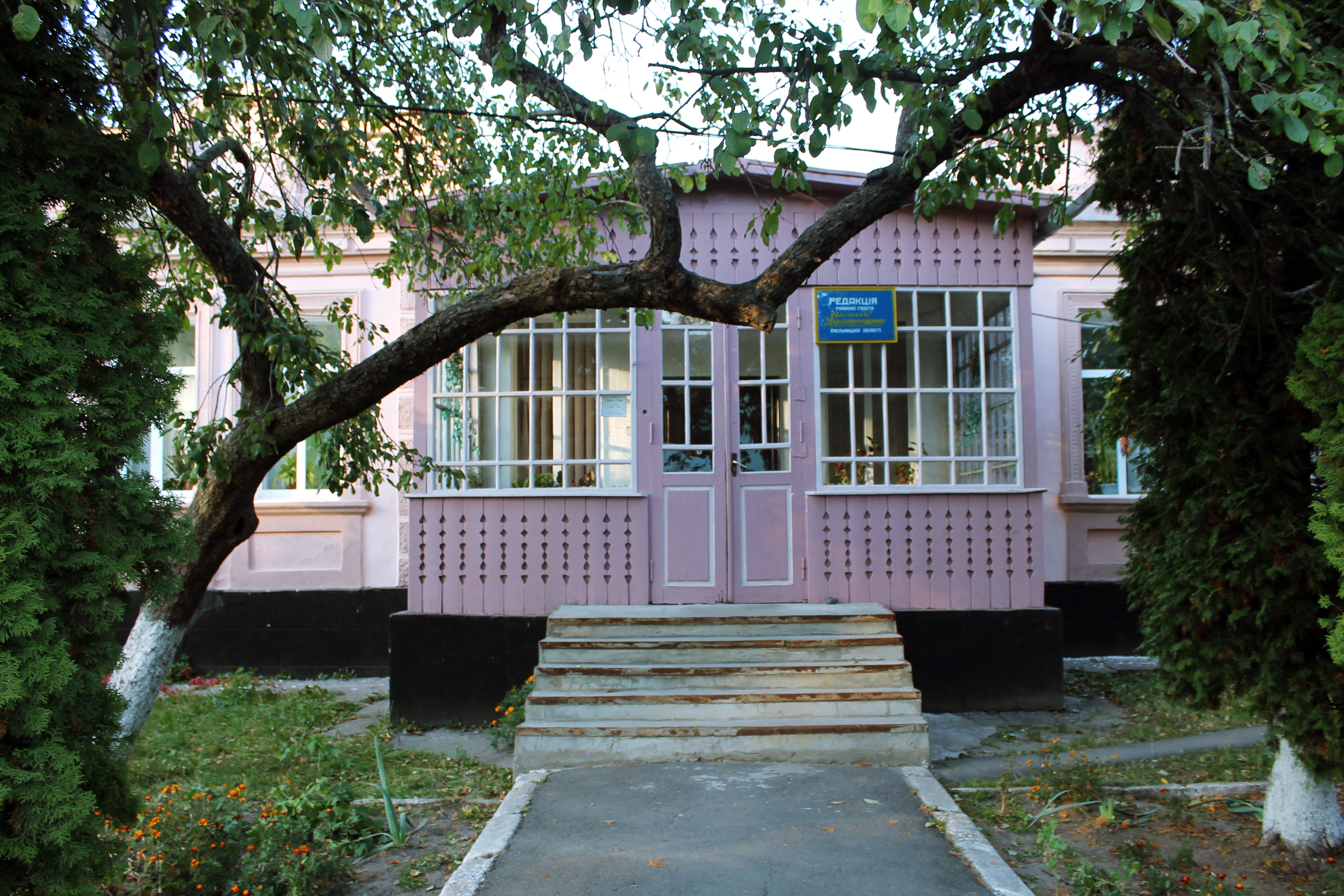
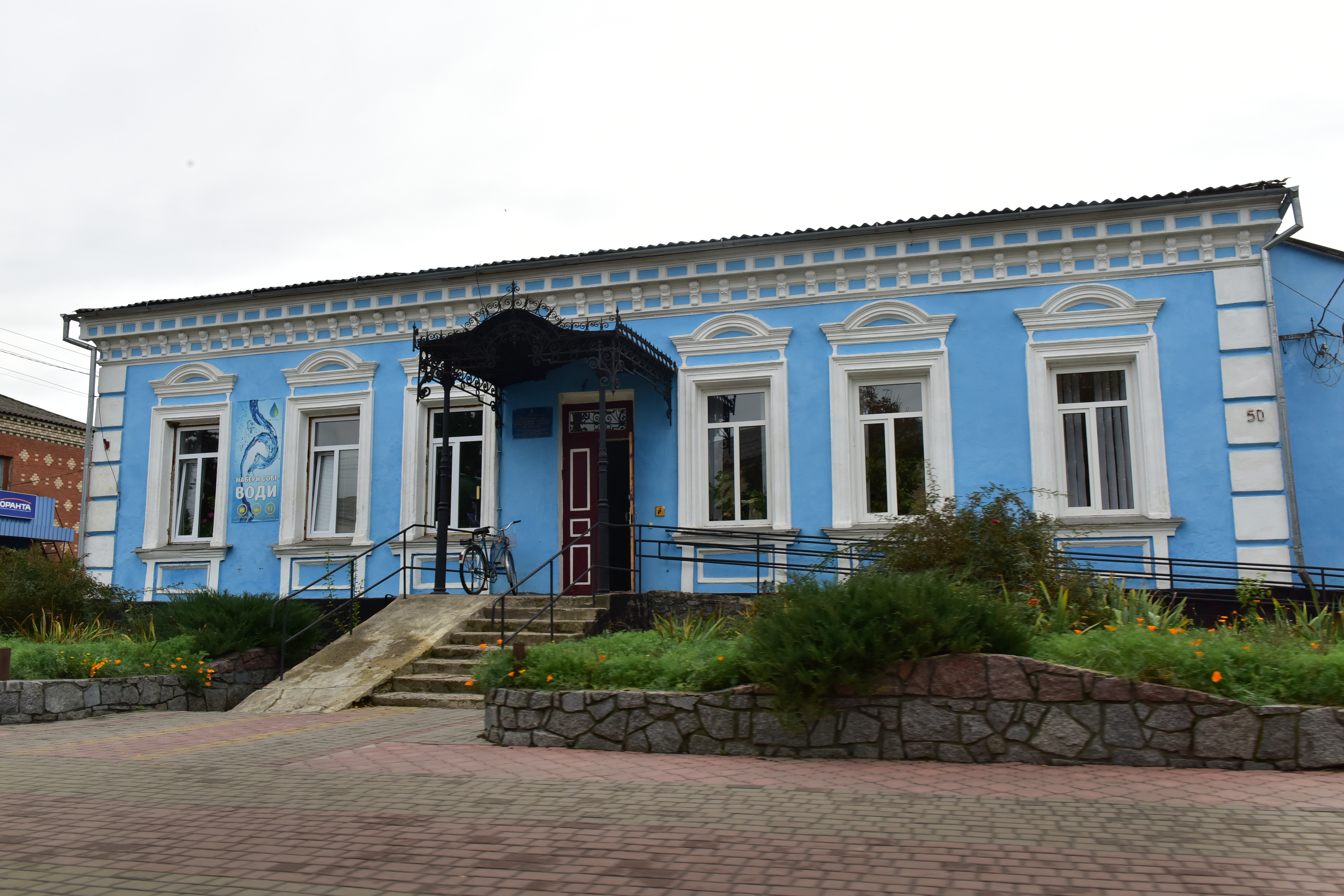
- From top to bottom, left to right: Manor or Hershhorin; Monument to the Soldiers of Derazhnia; Panorama of Derazhnia; Residential House at Myru Street, 77; Manor at Myru Street, 50

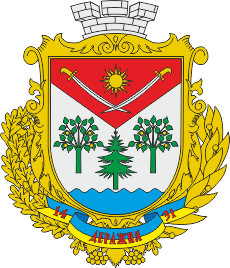
- Coat of arms

- Location within Ukraine
- Country: Ukraine
- Oblast: Khmelnytskyi Oblast
- Raion: Khmelnytskyi Raion
- Hromada: Derazhnia urban hromada
- First mentioned: 1431

Population (2022)
  - Total: 9,772

Derazhnia (Ukrainian: Деражня, IPA: [deˈrɑʒnʲɐ]; Polish: Derażnia) is a city and railway station in Khmelnytskyi Raion, Khmelnytskyi Oblast (province) of western Ukraine. Derazhnia is situated along the banks of the Vovk River (meaning wolf in Ukrainian), 42 km east from the regional center Khmelnytskyi. An important railway junction on the line Lviv-Khmelnytskyi-Zhmerynka. Derazhnia has 10.240 inhabitants (2024 census). It hosts the administration of Derazhnia urban hromada, one of the hromadas of Ukraine. Postal code for Derazhnia is 32200.

== History ==
Derazhnia is first mentioned in historical sources in 1431. Turkish records from 1542 to 1543 report that the town site had a small Cossack detachment consisting of no more than a few huts. In 1552 there were only eleven persons living in Derazhnia, four of whom later died in an epidemic. Tatars attacked the town in 1567. Derazhnia was attacked by Bogdan Khmelnitsky's cossacks in 1648. Derazhnia was occupied by Turkey in 1672, becoming part of the Turkish Ejalet of Kamieniecki. It was a nahiya centre in Bar sanjak during Turkish rule as Dırajna. In 1682, Derazhnia was recaptured by the Poles under Jan Sobiesky. It was nominally ruled by Ottomans between 1682-1699 and ravaged by Poles and Turks in this period. Finally Derazhnia was returned to Polish rule after Treaty of Karlowitz. A small castle was built here that lasted into the early 20th century but is now destroyed.

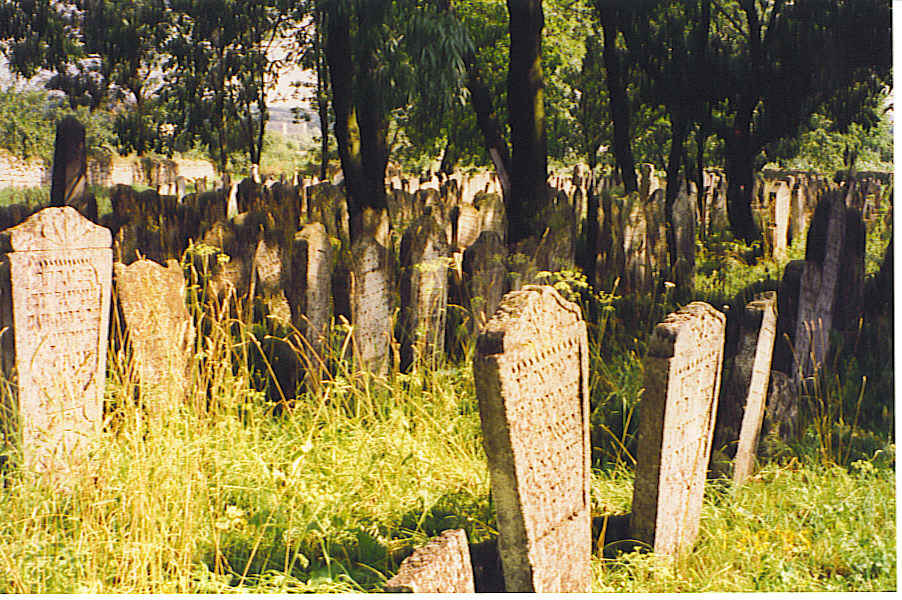
Well-preserved Jewish cemetery that contains burials from at least the 1700s

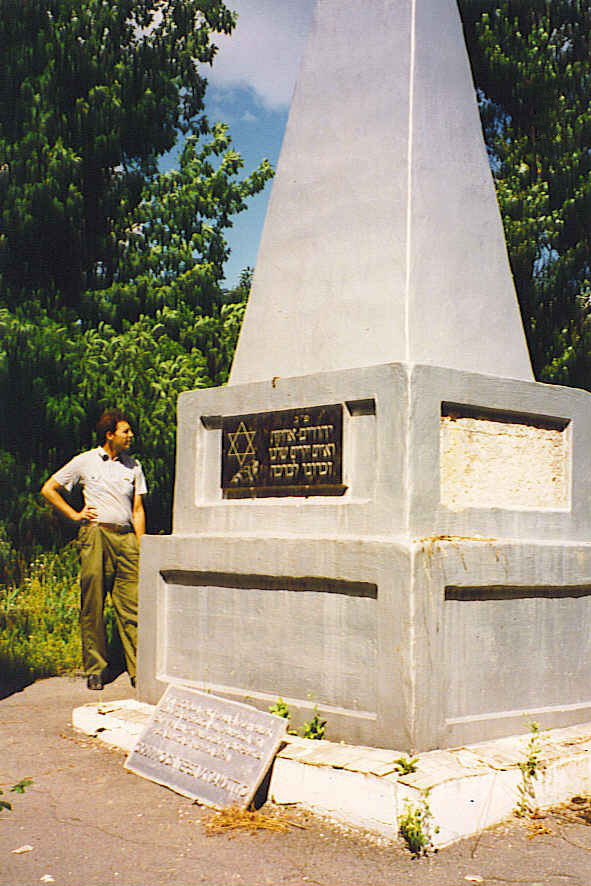
Monument located at the mass shooting site of Derazhnia. It contains the graves of about 4,000 Jews and Romas.

The first Jews in Derazhnia are reported in stories within Shivhei haBesht (stories about the Baal Shem Tov) that probably date from about 1750. The well-preserved Jewish Cemetery has burials from at least the late 18th century and maybe earlier. Derazhnia passed into Russian hands during the second partition of Poland in 1793. Starting in the 1840s, special Jewish agricultural colonies were granted close to Derazhnia. The largest and most prosperous was Staro Zakrevsky Meidan, founded 1844. It continued until it was turned into a kolkhoz Staryi Maidan by the Soviets in 1928.

Historically, Derazhnia was a tiny, impoverished village in the middle of nowhere until the Southern-Western Railroad was built in 1871–1876. Due to the railroad, the population of Derazhnia swelled from 1,201 people in 1873 to 6,118 people in 1897 and of this 5,230 were the Jews.

The large crowded halls of the Derazhnia train station served as a kind of international marketplace and clubhouse. It became possible for local merchants to interact with banking figures and merchants from all over Europe. The economy of Derazhnia thrived. Ukrainian Jewish writer Sholom Aleichem wrote the fictional humorous short story "The German" taking place in Derazhnia. The train station figures prominently in the story.

During World War I the railroad served a different purpose. The train station and embankments were fortified and military supply trains passed through every 10 to 15 minutes. The train station served as a vector of communications and news. After the 1917 Bolshevik Revolution, Derazhnia saw numerous pogroms, due both to the communications and the strategic importance of the rail station.

On 30 July 1919 a battle between the Ukrainian Galician Army and Bolshevik forces took place in Derazhnia. In autumn of the same year the area another battle between the army of the Ukrainian People's Republic and the Whites.

Under Soviet rule starting 1922, the region's economy improved. Electricity, schools, roads and other infrastructure were built. Several kolkhozi (collective farms) were established nearby. In the early 1930s, pressure from the government to collectivize and the needs of private peasants resulted in severe food shortages that resulted in famines throughout Ukraine. In 1932 Derazhnia had a population of approximately 5,000 inhabitants.

In World War II, Derazhnia fell to Nazi forces during Operation Barbarossa on July 11, 1941, after heavy fighting. It remained in Nazi hands until it was liberated by Soviet troops on March 25, 1944. The rail station was fortified by the Nazis while the railway was used to help supply the front. Jews from Derazhnia and nearby towns were concentrated into Derazhnia Ghetto. Included were about 200 Roma (Gypsies) from nearby Vovkovyntsi. On September 20, 1942, about 4,000 people were shot - the entire Jewish community perished.

During the Cold War, a field of intercontinental ballistic missile silos operated by the Soviet Strategic Rocket Forces existed near the town. This missile field was similar to the one at Pervomaisk and was the subject of intense negotiation during SALT II.

Until 18 July 2020, Derazhnia was the administrative center of Derazhnia Raion. The raion was abolished in July 2020 as part of the administrative reform of Ukraine, which reduced the number of raions of Khmelnytskyi Oblast to three. The area of Derazhnia Raion was merged into Khmelnytskyi Raion.

== Demographics ==
In 2001, Derazhnia had a population of 10,437, which decreased to 9,772 in 2022. In terms of ethnicity, the population is almost entirely Ukrainian, while only marginal Russian, Polish and Belarusian minorities reside in the town. The exact ethnic composition according to the 2001 Ukrainian census was as follows:

Ethnic groups in Derazhnia
	percent
Ukrainians	96.55%
Russians	2.03%
Poles	0.29%
Belarusians	0.20%
Moldovans	0.16%
Armenians	0.12%
others	0.65%

In terms of religious affiliation, local Ukrainian inhabitants belong mainly to the Ukrainian Orthodox Church.

== Economy ==
Derazhnia Milk Plant is one of key enterprises in the city. Local Sugar Factory was 5th largest in Ukraine, defunct from the late 1990s - early 21st century. There are also chemical and brickworks industries. Historically, Derazhnia has been an area of peat production.

== Notable people ==
- Rose Pesotta (1896–1965), born Rakhel Peisoty, immigrated to the US in 1913, became an important American labor leader
