= Letychiv Fortress =

Coordinates: 49°22′53″N 27°37′08″E

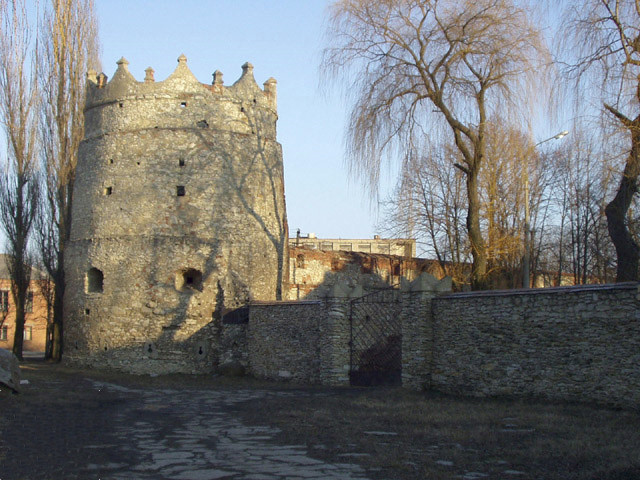
- The only surviving tower of the fortress

Site history
- Built: 1598

Immovable Monument of National Significance of Ukraine
- Official name: Мури з баштою (Walls with a tower)
- Type: Architecture
- Reference no.: 220039/2

The Letychiv Fortress (Ukrainian: Лети́чівський замок, romanized: Letychivs'kyi zamok) is a complex of limestone walls built in 1598 by Jan Potocki to defend Podolia from the regular raids of the Crimean Tatars. The north-western tower, the eastern wall and parts of the southern wall still stand in the town of Letychiv, Ukraine. The most prominent feature on the grounds of the fortress is the Baroque church of the Assumption (1606–1638, rebuilt 1724). There's also a statue of Ustym Karmaliuk, a rebel leader buried at Letychiv. During World War II, the castle served as a notorious slave labor camp.

== See also ==
- Medzhybizh Fortress
