= Vasily Tropinin =

Russian Romantic painter

- Василий Тропинин
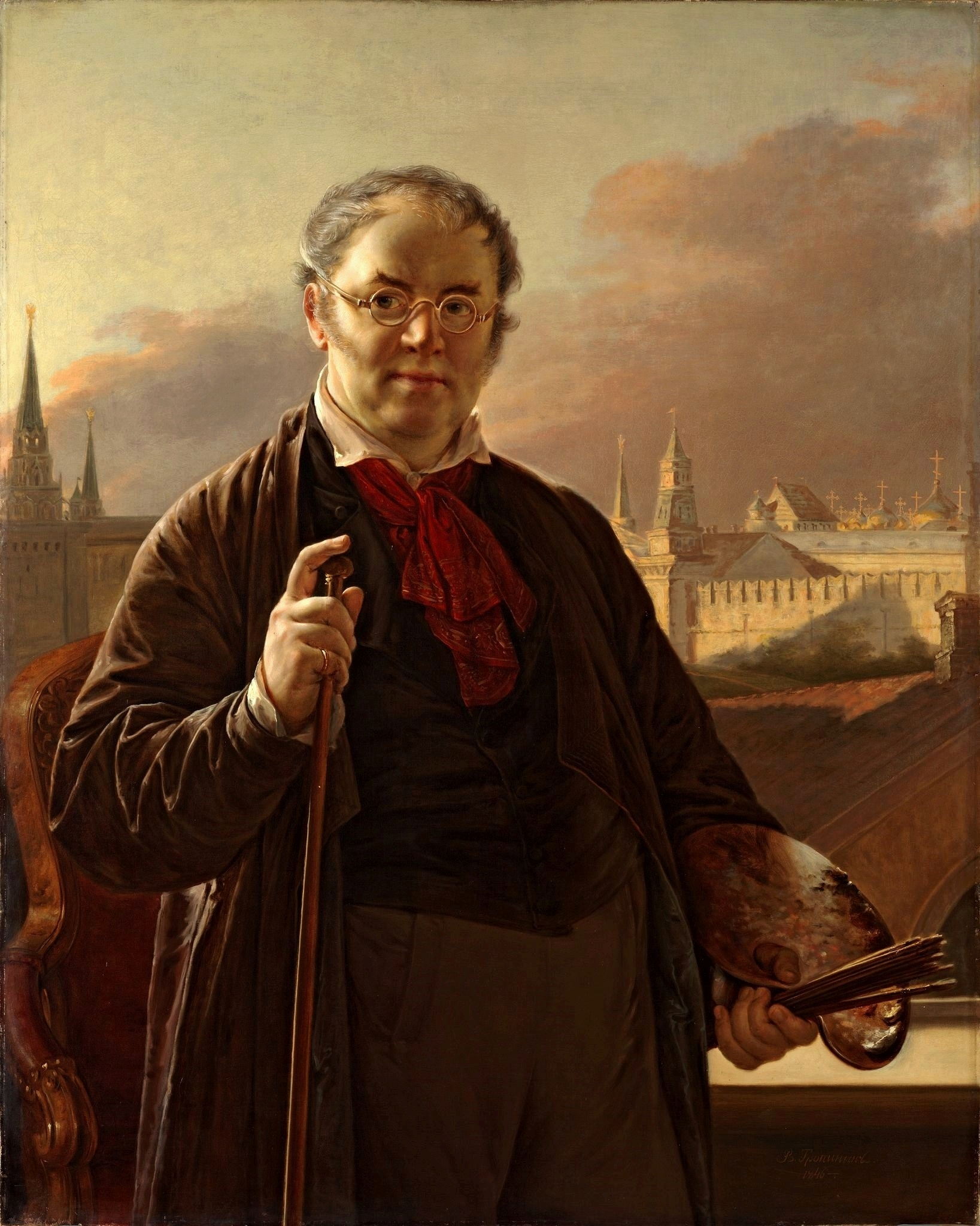
- Self-Portrait in the Front of the Kremlin, 1844; Tropinin Museum, Moscow
- Born: 30 March 1776; Korpovo village, near Novgorod, Russian Empire
- Died: 16 May 1857 (aged 81); Moscow, Russian Empire
- Resting place: Vagankovo Cemetery, Moscow
- Education: Imperial Academy of Arts (1804); Member Academy of Arts (1824)
- Known for: Painting, Drawing
- Movement: Romanticism

Vasily Andreevich Tropinin (Russian: Василий Андреевич Тропинин; 30 March [O.S. 19 March] 1776 – 16 May [O.S. 4 May] 1857) was a Russian Romantic painter, active in Moscow during Tsars Alexander I and Nicholas I's reigns. Much of his life was spent as a serf, not attaining freedom until he was more than forty years old. Three of his more important works are a portrait of Alexander Pushkin and paintings called The Lace Maker and The Gold-Embroideress.

== Biography ==
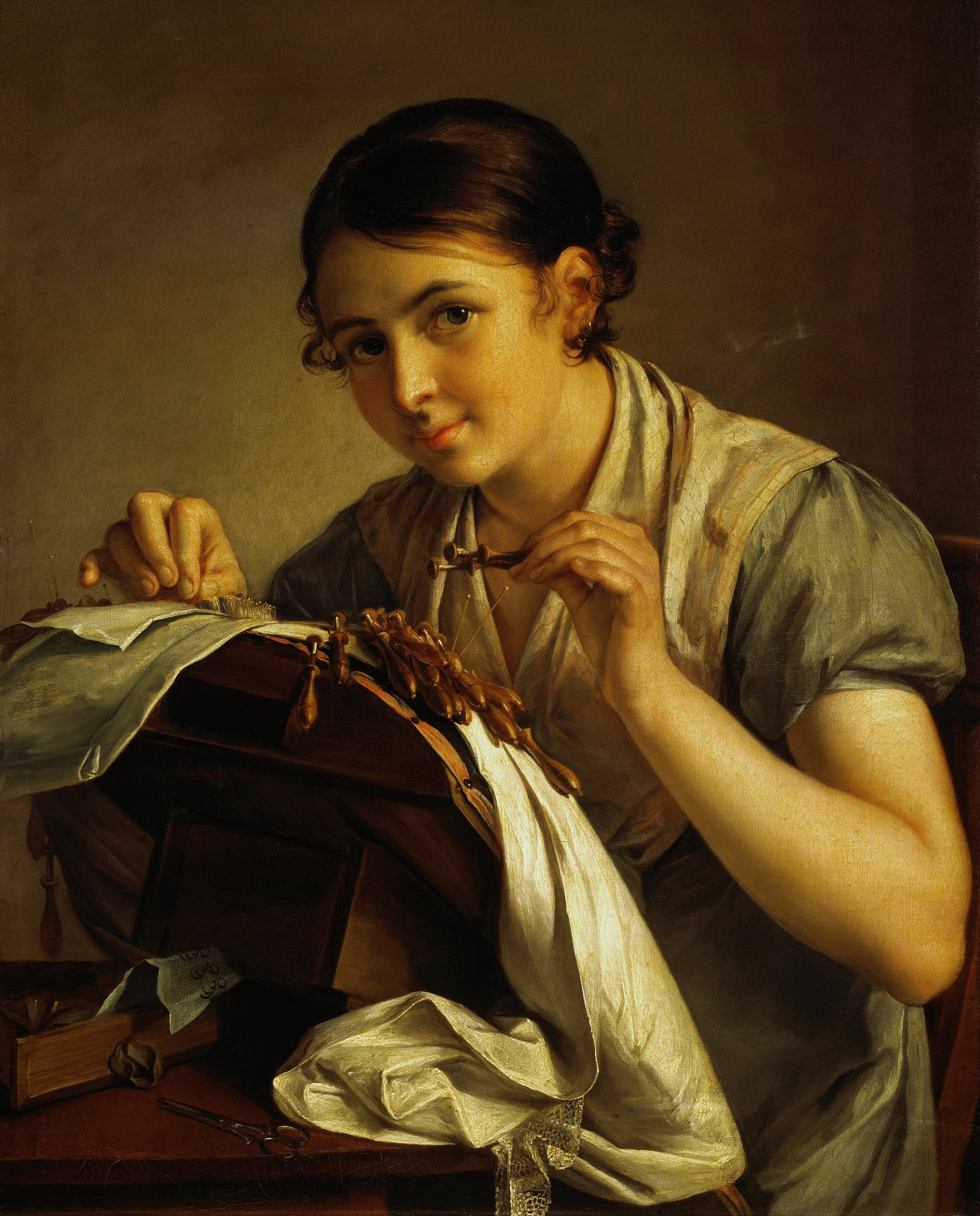
Lace making beauty, 1823

Vasily was born as a serf of Count Ludwig Anton von Munnich, the grandson to the Petrine general, in the village Korpovo of the Novgorod Governorate. He was transferred to the Munnichs' son-in-law, General Irakliy Morkov as part of the dowry of Munnich's daughter. Soon he was sent to Saint Petersburg to study the trade of a confectioner. Instead of learning his trade Tropinin secretly attended free drawing lessons in the Imperial Academy of Arts.

In 1799, his owner allowed Tropinin to study at the Academy as a non-degree student (Postoronny uchenik). He took lessons from S. S. Schukin and was supported by the President of the Academy Alexander Sergeyevich Stroganov. In 1804 Tropinin's work Boy Grieving for a Dead Bird was exhibited in the Academy's exhibition and was noted by the Russian Empress at the time (most probably the Dowager Empress Maria Feodorovna).

At the dawn of his success, Count Morkov recalled Tropinin from St. Petersburg to his Ukrainian estate Kukavka. Tropinin was appointed a confectioner and a lackey. Soon the owner changed his mind and assigned Tropinin to copy the works of European and Russian painters and produce portraits of the Morkovs. Tropinin also painted the local church. Tropinin spent around twenty years of his life in Ukraine, and many of his works from that time were of Ukrainian people and the Ukrainian countryside.

Still Tropinin continued to work and study. As a well-established portraitist, he wrote:

I studied little...at the Academy, but I learned...in Malorossia. There I painted from nature without rest, painted everything and everyone and these works, it seems, are the best of all of those created by me thus far.

The most notable works of that period are Portrait of A. I. Tropinina, the Artist's Wife (1809), Portrait of Arseny Tropinin, son of the artist (c. 1818), Portrait of the Writer and Historian N. M. Karamzin (1818).

== Academician ==
In 1823 at the age of 47 Tropinin at last became a free man and moved to Moscow. The same year he presented his paintings The Lace Maker, The Beggar and The Portrait of artist Skotnikov to the Imperial Academy of Arts and received the official certificate of a painter (Svobodnyj Khudozhnik). In 1824 he was elected an Academician.

Since 1833 he mastered the Moscow Public Art Classes that later became the famous Moscow School of Painting, Sculpture and Architecture. In 1843 he was elected an honorary member of the Moscow Art Society. He died in 1857 and was interred in Vagankovo Cemetery. During his life Tropinin painted more than 3,000 portraits.

In 1969 the Tropinin Museum was opened in Moscow.

== Works ==
Vasily Tropinin's works

Girl from Podolye, 1804–1807

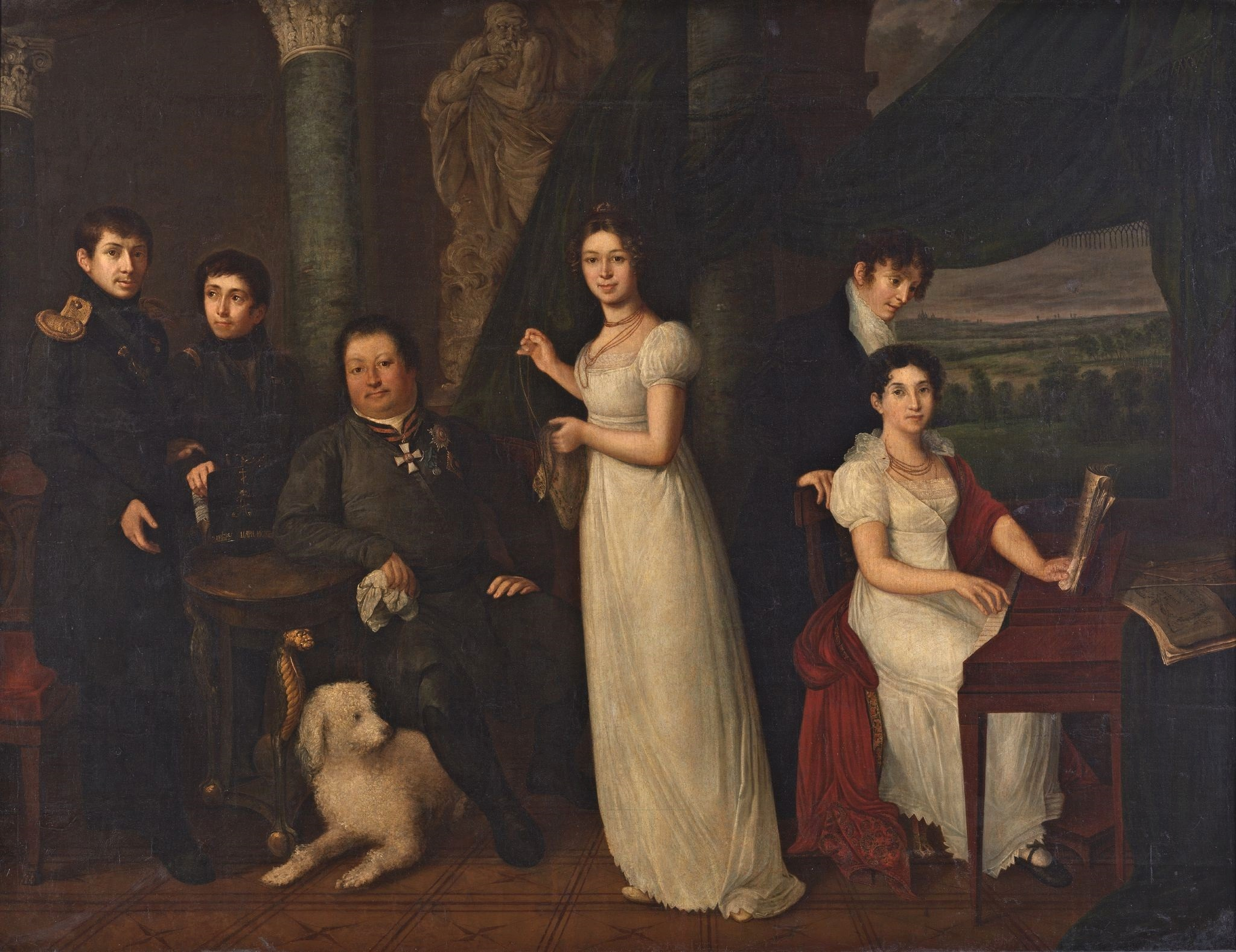
Family portrait of counts Morkovs, 1813

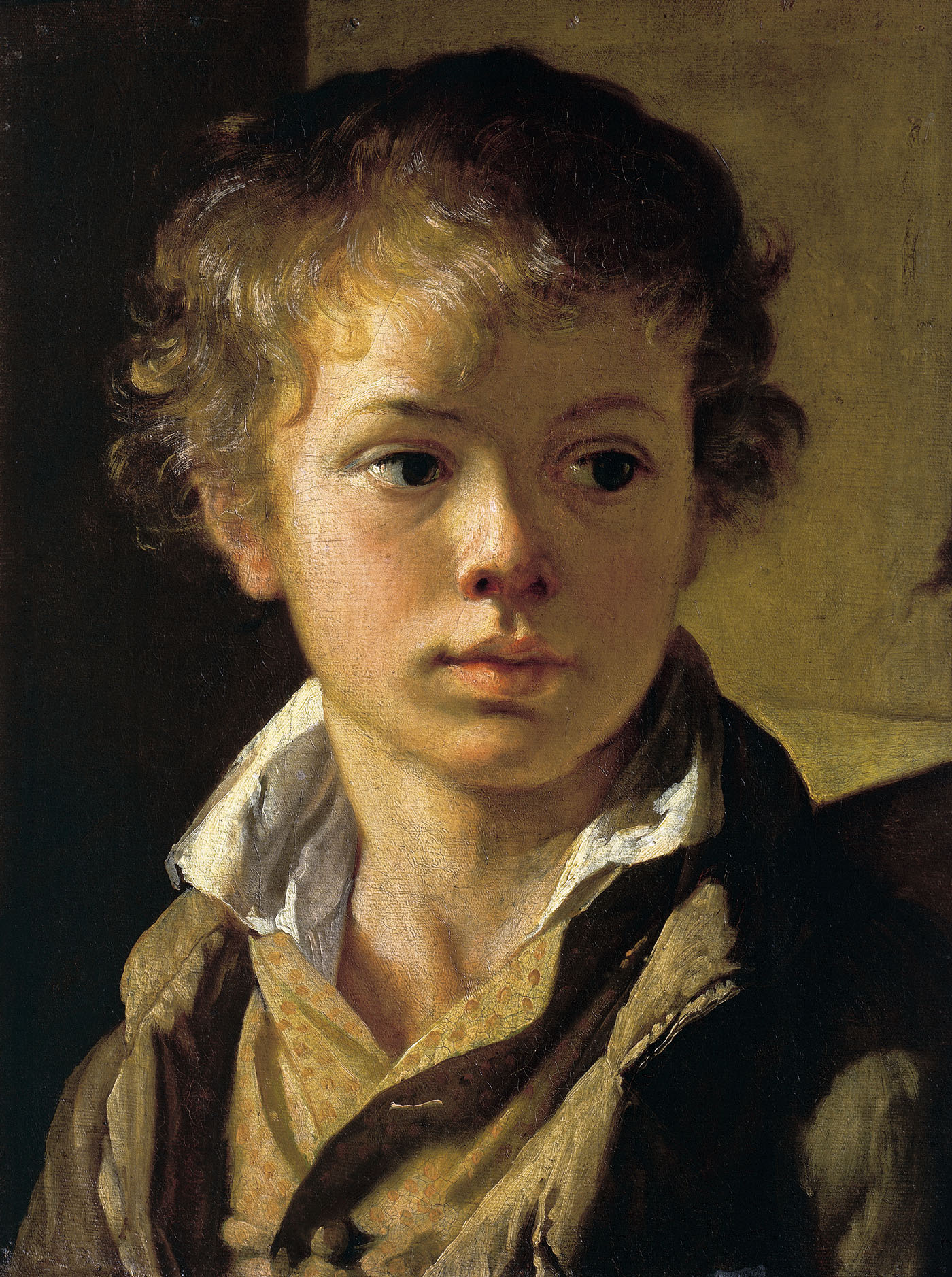
Portrait of Arseny Tropinin, son of the artist, 1818

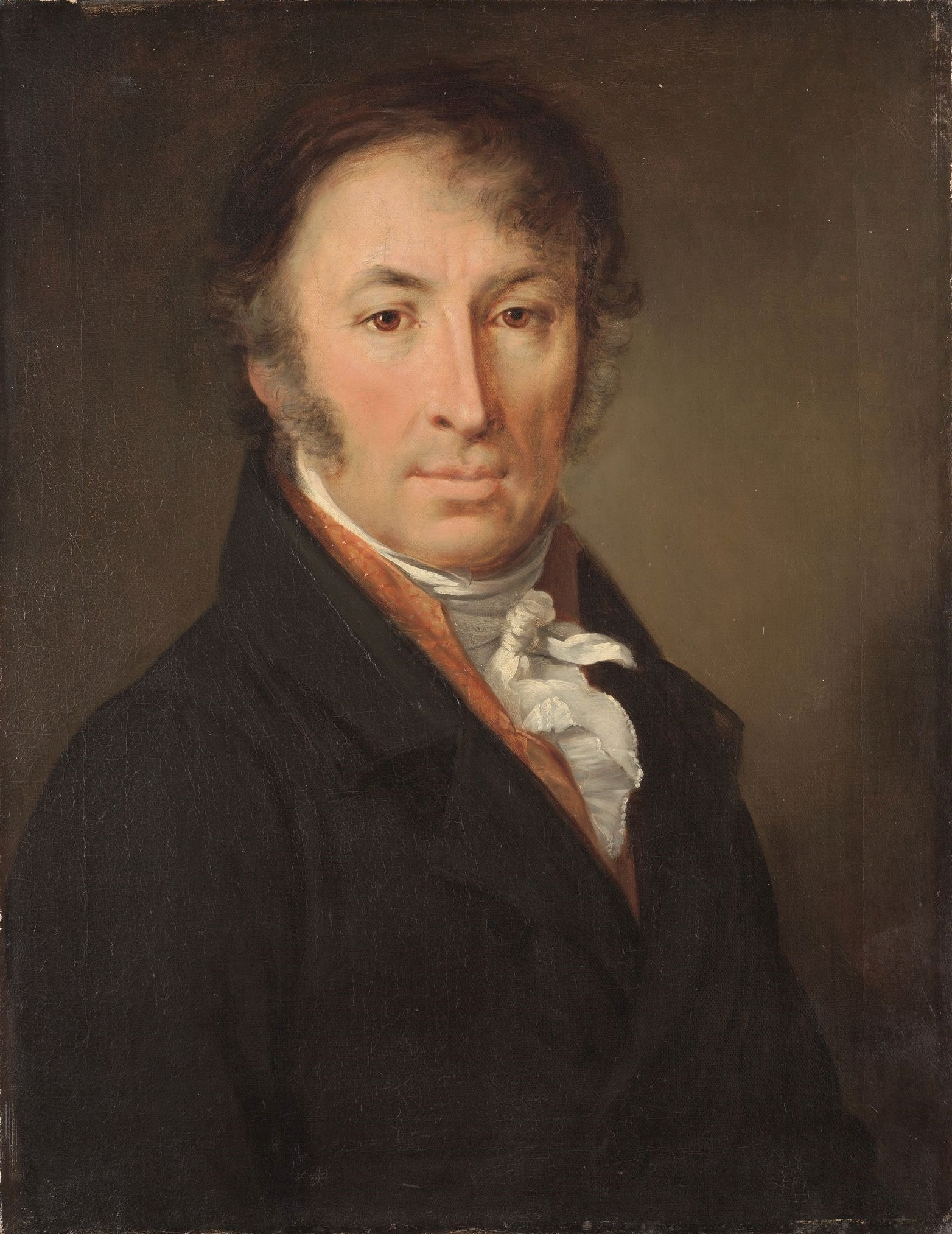
Portrait of Nikolay Karamzin, 1818

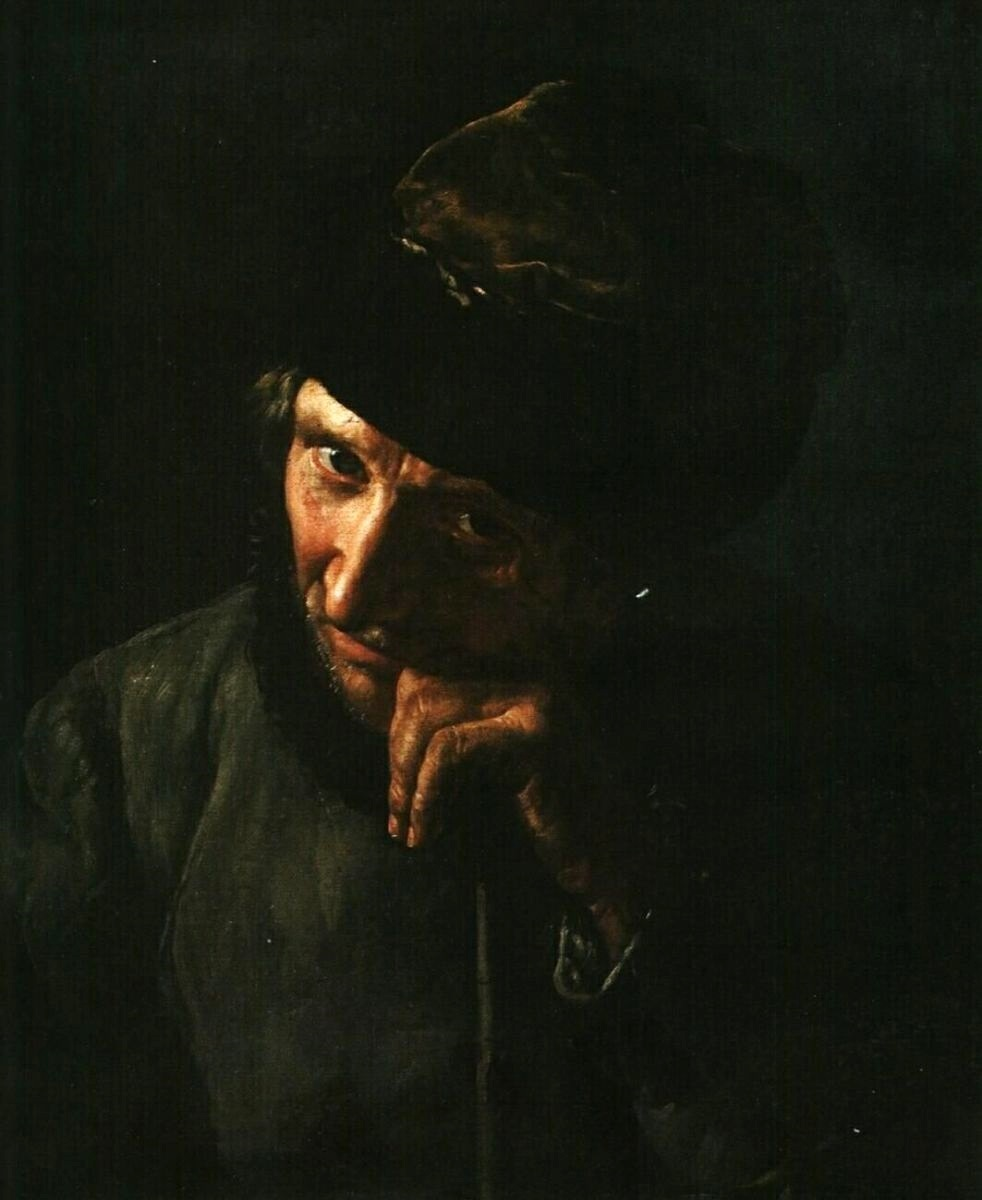
Coachman 1820

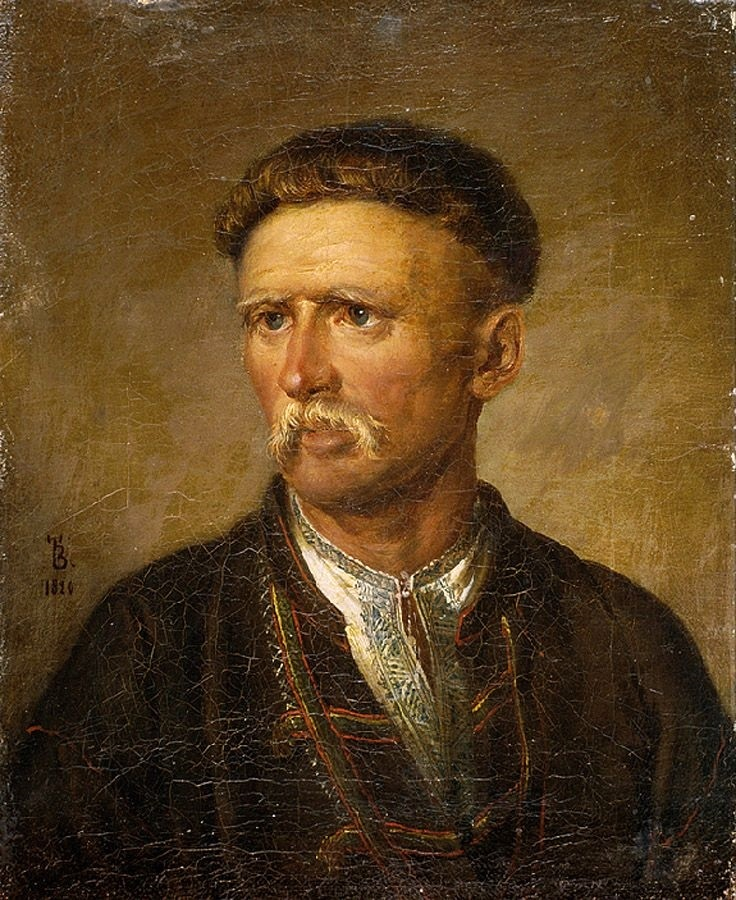
Ustym Karmeliuk, 1820s

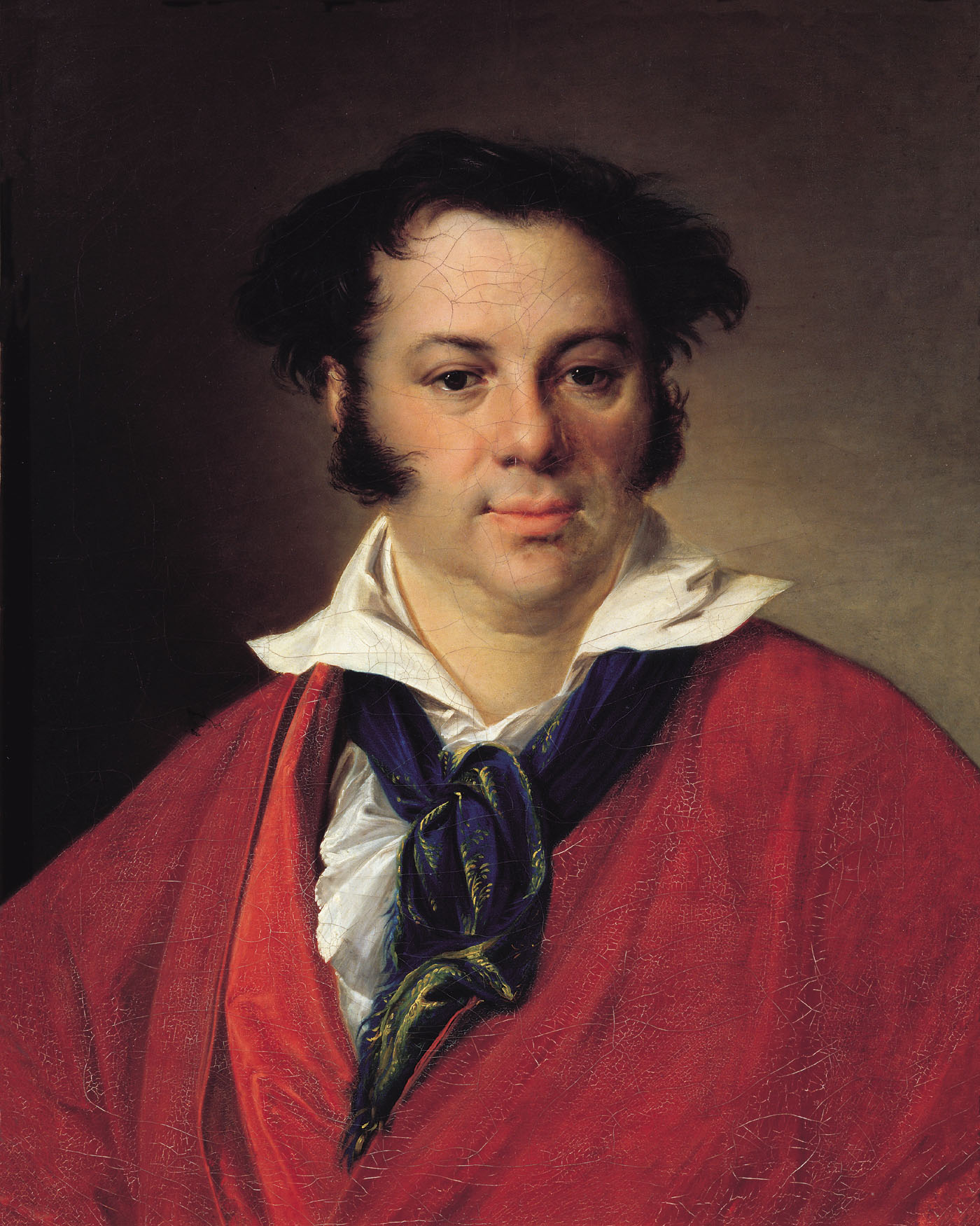
Konstantin Ravich, 1823

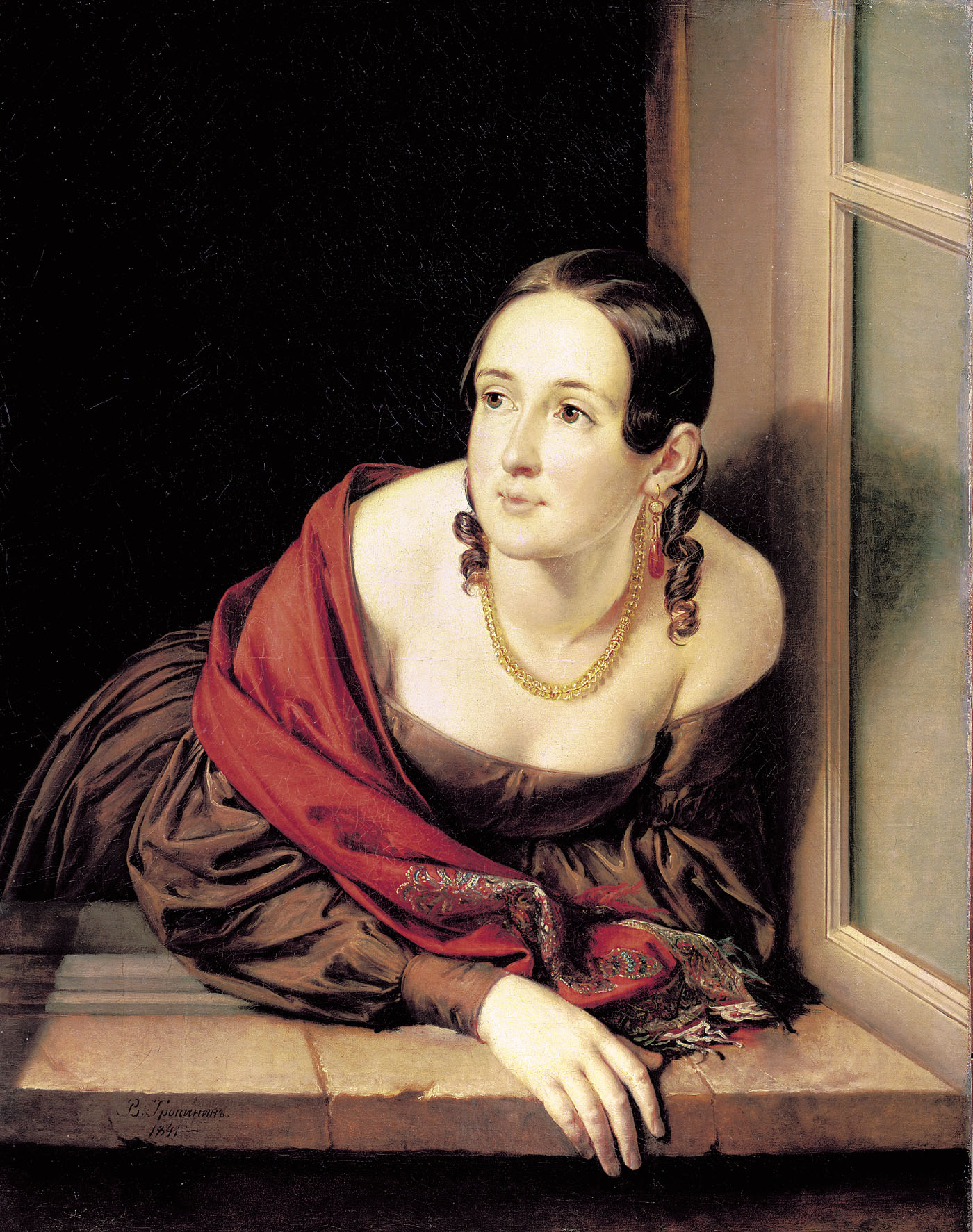
Woman at the window, 1841

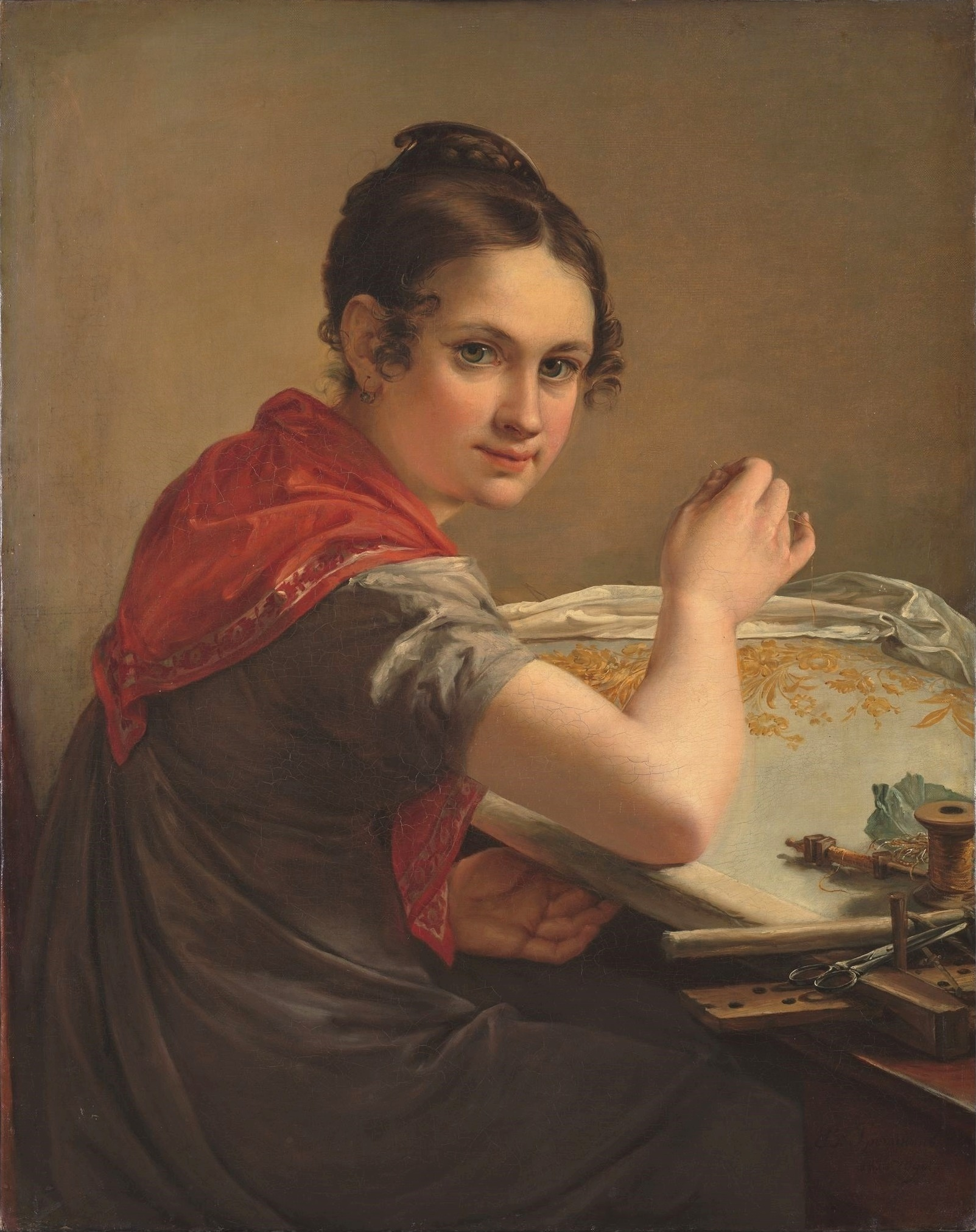
The Gold-Embroideress, 1826

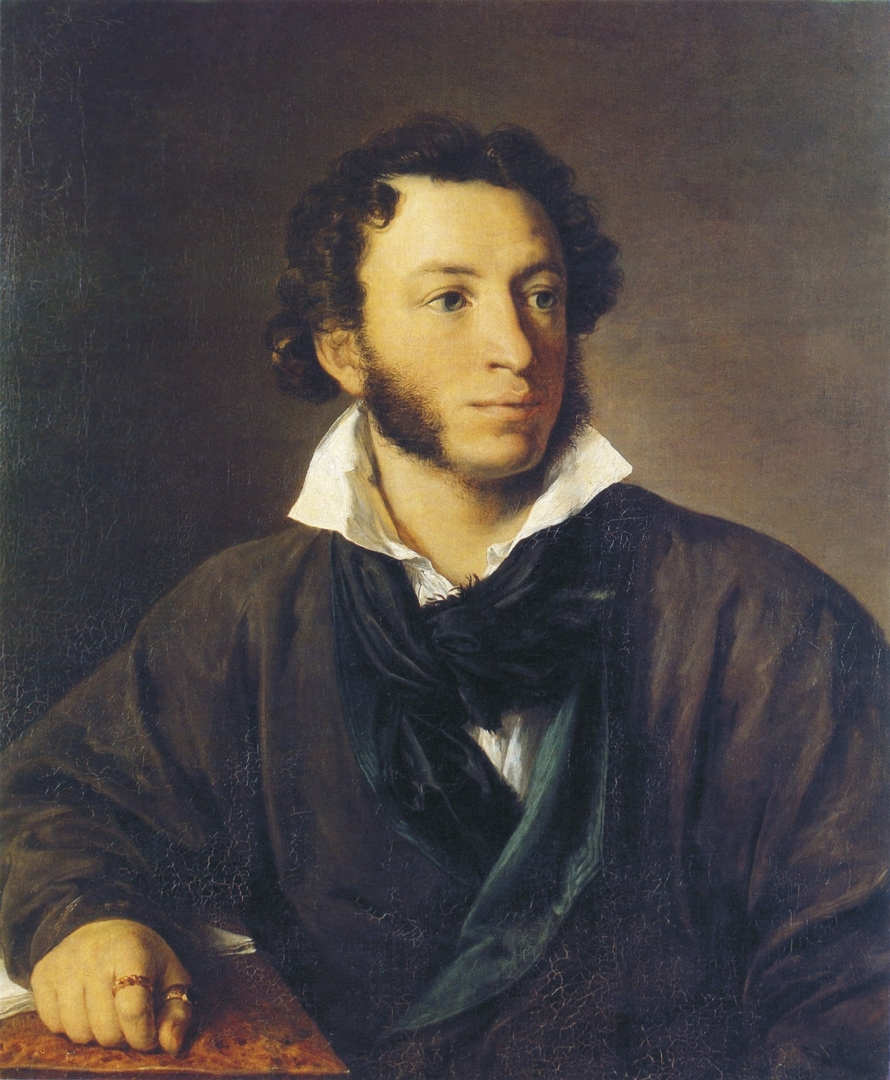
Portrait of Alexander Pushkin, 1827

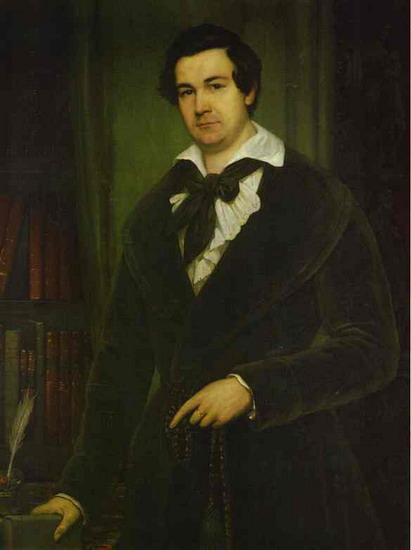
Portrait of Vasily Karatygin, 1842

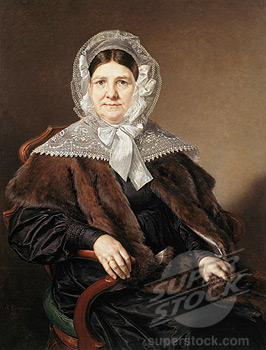
Portrait Of A.F. Mazurina, 1839
