= Vovk (river) =

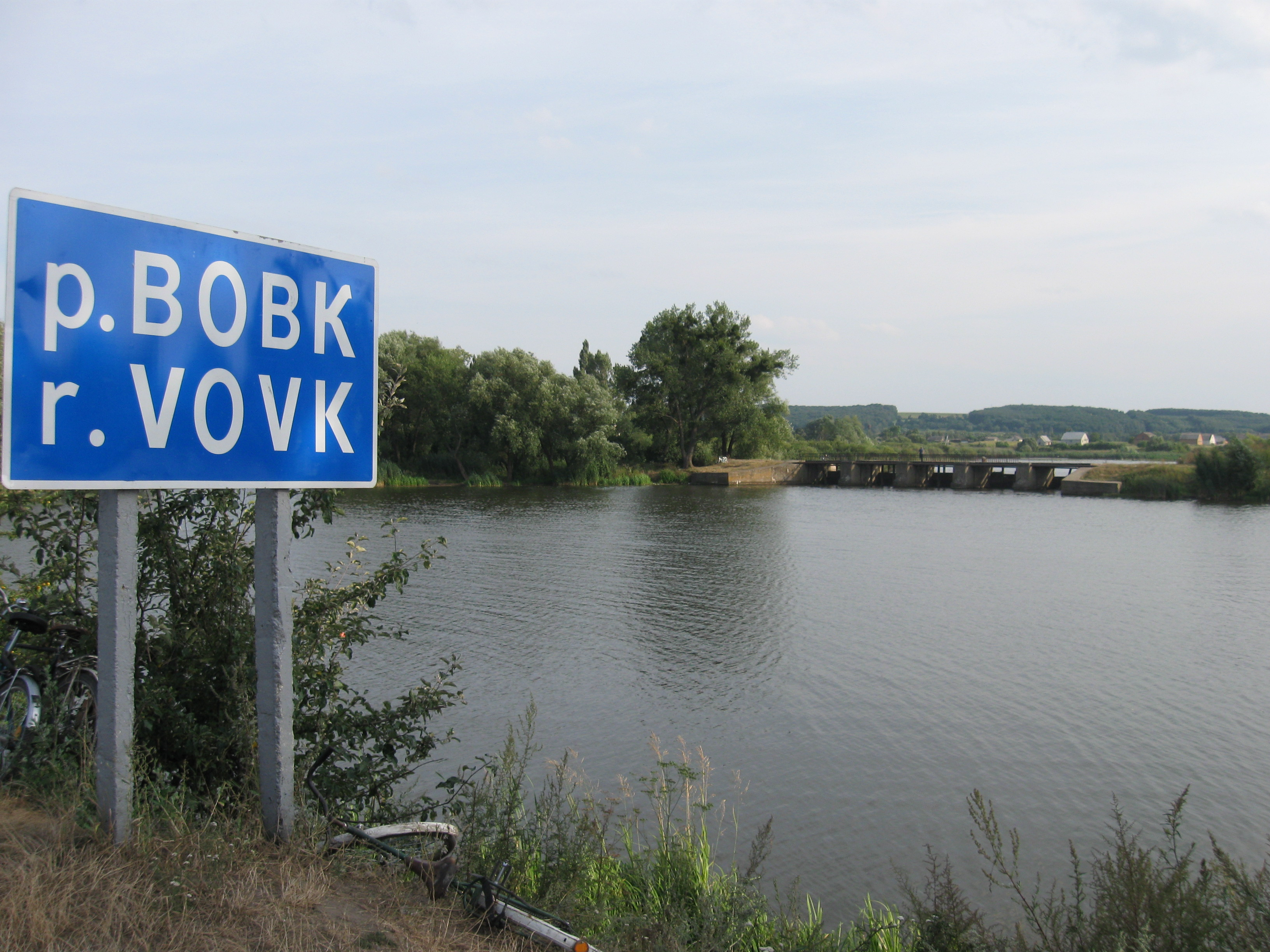

Location
- Country: Ukraine

Physical characteristics
- Mouth: Southern Bug
  - coordinates: 49.375°N 27.6098°E

Basin features
- Progression: Southern Bug→ Dnieper–Bug estuary→ Black Sea

The Vovk (meaning: wolf) is a river in Ukraine. It flows through the Khmelnytskyi Oblast of western Ukraine and is a right-bank tributary of the Southern Bug in the Black Sea basin. The Vovk flows through Derazhnya and enters the Southern Bug in Letychiv.
