= Lozove =

Rural locality in Khmelnytskyi Oblast, Ukraine

Lozove Лозове
- Rural settlement
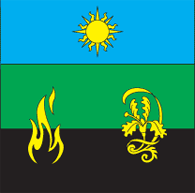
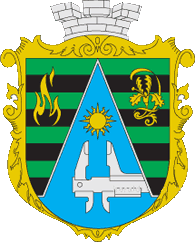
- Flag Coat of arms

- Location within Khmelnytskyi Oblast Location within Ukraine
- Coordinates: 49°17′35″N 27°17′57″E
- Country: Ukraine
- Oblast: Khmelnytskyi Oblast
- Raion: Khmelnytskyi Raion
- Hromada: Derazhnia urban hromada
- Founded: 1929
- Town status: 1949

Area
  - Total: 0.001 km^{2} (0.00039 sq mi)
- Elevation: 288 m (945 ft)

Population (2001 census)
  - Total: 1,650
  - Density: 1,700,000/km^{2} (4,300,000/sq mi)
- Time zone: UTC+2 (EET)
  - Summer (DST): UTC+3 (EEST)
- Postal code: 32216
- Area code: +380 3856
- Website: http://rada.gov.ua/

Lozove (Ukrainian: Лозове) is a rural settlement in Khmelnytskyi Raion, Khmelnytskyi Oblast, western Ukraine. It belongs to Derazhnia urban hromada, one of the hromadas of Ukraine. The settlement's population was 1,650 as of the 2001 Ukrainian Census and 1,500 (2022 estimate).

== History ==
The settlement was first founded in 1929 as Torforozrobka (Ukrainian: Торфорозробка). It received the status of an urban-type settlement in 1949.

Until 18 July 2020, Lozove belonged to Derazhnia Raion. The raion was abolished in July 2020 as part of the administrative reform of Ukraine, which reduced the number of raions of Khmelnytskyi Oblast to three. The area of Derazhnia Raion was merged into Khmelnytskyi Raion.

Until 26 January 2024, Lozove was designated urban-type settlement. On this day, a new law entered into force which abolished this status, and Lozove became a rural settlement.

== See also ==
- Vovkovyntsi, the other urban-type settlement in Derazhnia Raion of Khmelnytskyi Oblast
