= Kolonja Izaaka =

Village in Grodno region, Belarus

Kolonja Izaaka קולוניה איזאקה
- Village
- Interactive map of Kolonja Izaaka
- Coordinates: 53.3967°N 23.7369°E
- Country: Belarus
- Region: Grodno Region
- District: Grodno District
- Founded: 1849
- Destroyed by the Nazis: 1942

Kolonja Izaaka (Kolonia Isaaka, Isakowa, קולוניה איזאקה) was a small Jewish farming village in what is now Belarus, founded in 1849 through government land grants to 26 poor Jewish families for the purpose of engaging in agriculture. The settlement existed continuously until liquidated by the Nazis in November, 1942. It is a prime example of Jewish agricultural colonies in the Russian Empire.

== Location ==
The community was founded 1.5 km southwest of the town of Odelsk, then part of Grodno Governorate. After World War I, the community was annexed into the newly reunified Poland. Although Odelsk still exists, the former site of Kolonja Izaaka is now a border zone, accessible only to Belarus border police and guard dogs.

== Life in Kolonja Izaaka ==
The community at Kolonja Izaaka survived through growing various crops, including grains, legumes, orchard fruits, and by raising bees for honey. They sold their goods at market in nearby Sokółka. They received direct financial support from the Jewish Colonization Association, founded by Baron Maurice de Hirsch, as well as training support from ORT.

== Salomon Salit's study of Kolonja Izaaka ==
In 1934, Salomon Salit, a Jewish PhD student in agrarian economics at the University of Warsaw, published a dissertation about Kolonja Izaaka. It is a detailed record of the community's founding, economics and daily life. This book has been digitized and is available as a free download through the Polish library system.

== The destruction of Kolonja Izaaka ==
The Kolonja Izaaka community was destroyed by the Germany in 1942. There are differing reports as to their fate. They were probably moved, with the Jews of Odelsk, to the Kiełbasin Transit Camp near Grodno. From there they were likely transported within weeks to Treblinka or to Auschwitz-Birkenau. Some relatives of those who perished reported that their loved ones died in the death camps at Majdanek. In 1946 the colony was liquidated together with the nearby village of Charnavshchyzna (Belarusian: Чарнаўшчызна) due to the newly formed border between the People's Republic of Poland and the Soviet Union passing there.
