= Ustym Karmaliuk =

Ukrainian peasant outlaw (1787–1835)

- Устим Кармалюк
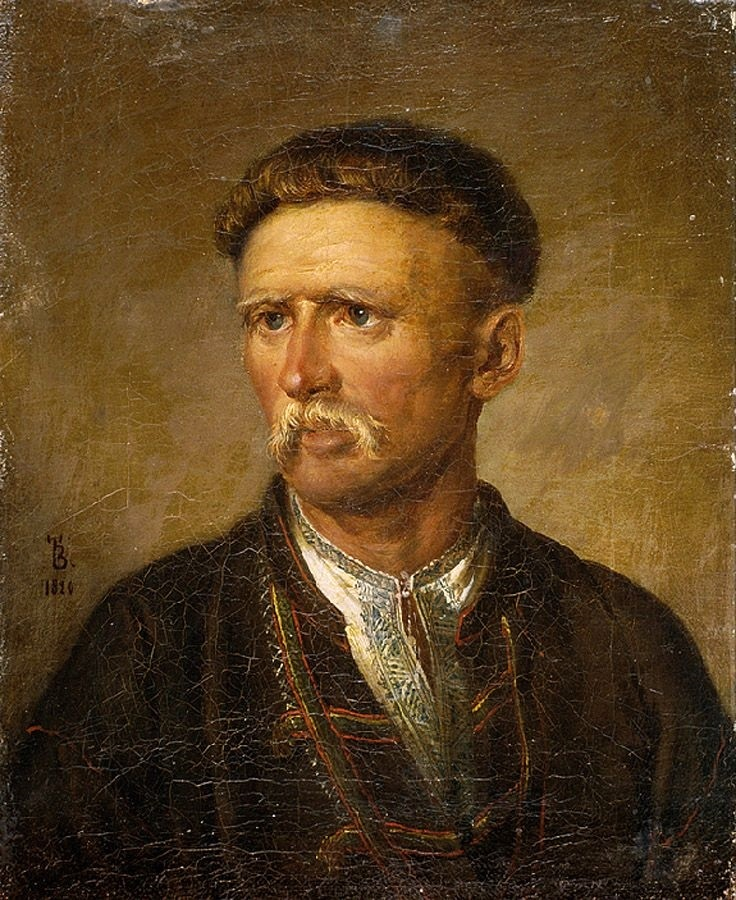
- Portrait by Vasily Tropinin (1820)
- Born: March 10, 1787; Holovchyntsi, Podolian Voivodeship, Lesser Poland Province, Crown of the Kingdom of Poland, Polish–Lithuanian Commonwealth
- Died: October 22, 1835 (aged 48); Korychyntsi Shliakhovi, Letichev uezd, Podolian Governorate, Russian Empire
- Cause of death: Murder
- Resting place: Letychiv
- Years active: 1813—1835

Ustym Yakymovych Karmaliuk (Ukrainian: Устим Якимович Кармалюк; (Note: Alternatively Karmelyuk; Ukrainian: Кармелюк) March 10, 1787 – October 22, 1835) was a Ukrainian outlaw who fought against the Russian administration and became a folk hero to the commoners of Ukraine. He is often referred to as the "Ukrainian Robin Hood" and "the last haydamak".

== Early life ==
Karmaliuk was born a serf in the settlement of Holovchyntsi in Letychiv County (powiat latyczówski) (in some sources, Lityn County) of the Podolian Voivodeship, Lesser Poland Province, Crown of the Kingdom of Poland, Polish–Lithuanian Commonwealth. He was baptized with the name Sebastian Karmaliuk on 10 March [O.S. 27 February] 1787.

Following the Second Partition of Poland in 1792, a vast territory of the Polish-Lithuanian Commonwealth was ceded to the Russian Empire including the eastern Podillia.

There is little known about his early life except that he possessed some literacy and was fluent in Russian, Polish and Yiddish, besides his native Ukrainian language, as attested by the police documents of the time. He was taken by his owner at the age of 17 to work as a servant in the manor, but was notoriously insolent. As a result, his owner decided to forcibly send him into Russian military service, in order to remove him from others whom he was inciting to rebellion.

== Established revolutionary ==
=== Army service and desertions ===
Karmaliuk was conscripted to serve in the Imperial Russian Army in Kamianets-Podilskyi. He was forcibly inducted into the Russian Imperial Army, and served in the Napoleonic Wars of 1812 in an Kharkov Dragoon Regiment, but eventually escaped and organized rebel bands who attacked merchants and landowners, while distributing the booty between the poor. He was captured in 1814, and was sentenced in Kamianets-Podilskyi to run a gauntlet of 500 blows, a typical military punishment. He was then sent to serve out the 25-year term of penal service in a military unit in the Crimea, but he fled again, returning to northern Podolia.

=== Rebellion ===
In Podolia, he once again organized rebel bands in Olhopil, Letychiv, and Lityn regions, attracting a wide support base among Ukrainians, Jews and even Poles. The rebellions intensified over the years, and then had spread not only to other parts of Podolia, but also to the neighboring provinces of Volynia, Kyivshchyna, and Bessarabia.

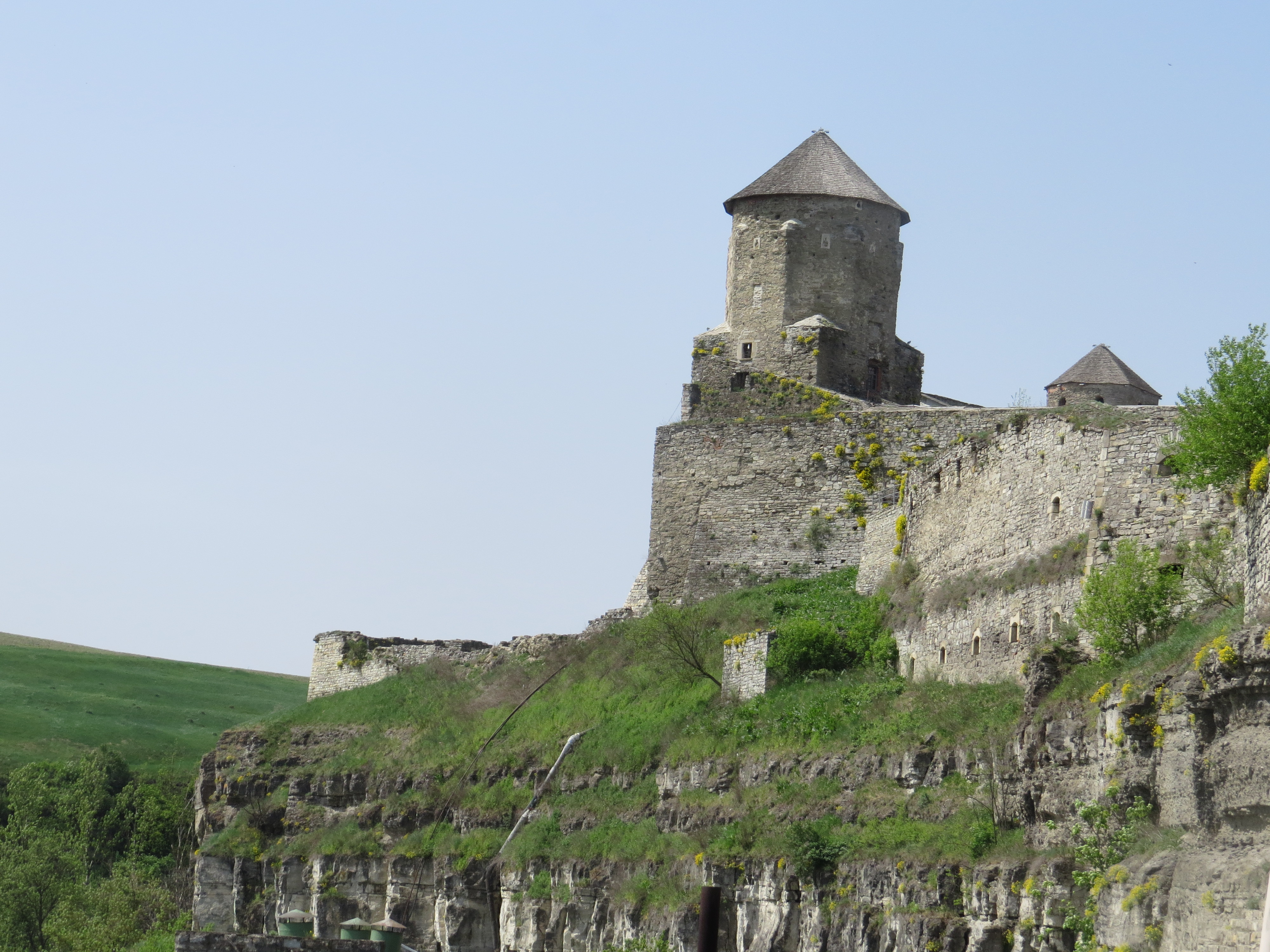
The Kamianets-Podisky fortress tower No.11 where Karmaliuk was detained

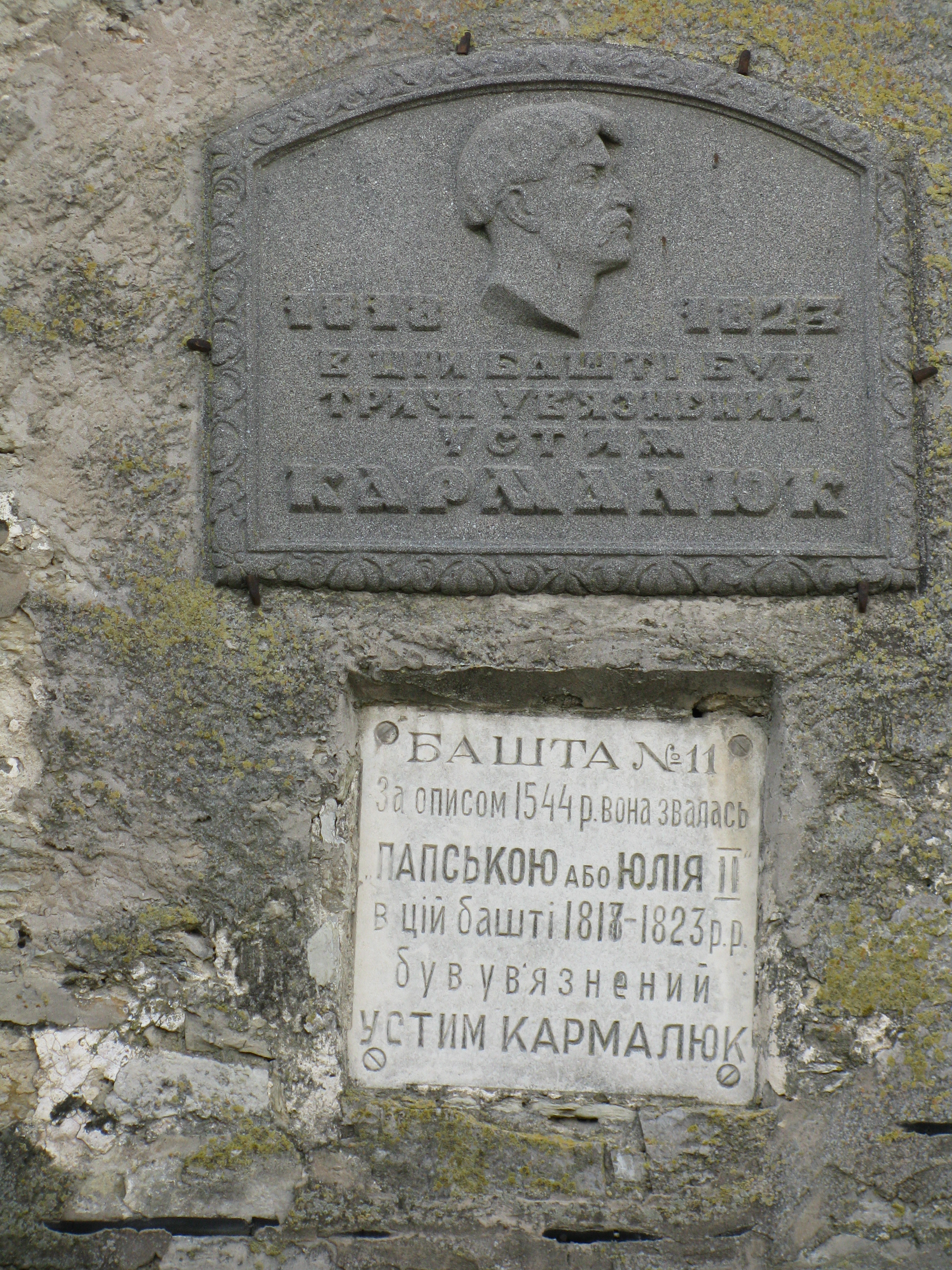
Memorial plaque about the tower

Karmaliuk escaped from the castle where he was held captive, but was captured yet again in 1817-18. The second time, he was sentenced to 25 blows with the knout in front of the town hall.

In 1822, Karmaliuk was arrested yet again and jailed for the third time in the castle's Pope's Tower. (Note: In honor of Karmaliuk, the Pope's Tower where he was frequently held captive in is also referred to as "Karmaliuk's Tower".) On the night of March 12–13, 1823, Karmaliuk organized an escape with his fellow inmates, during which he was injured and captured just two weeks later. In April 1823, Karmaliuk was sentenced to 101 hits with the knout in front of the town hall and sent to far-away Siberia. In 1825, he was transferred from the Tobolsk prison castle to Yalutorovsk. In the autumn of 1825, he escaped.

He reached Podolia in the spring of 1826. In June 1827, he was arrested again. In March 1828, Karmalyuk was sentenced to punishment with the 101st whip and hard labor for life. He was sent to the Borovlyansky convict distillery in the village of Borovlyanka, Kurgansky Uyezd, Tobolsk Governorate. In 1829, he escaped.

With the ongoing Polish uprising of 1831, by the early 1830s Karmaliuk's guerrilla army was approximately 20,000 strong, with over 1,000 raids on the estates of the Polish and Russian landowners over a 20-year period. The response of the tsar was to station military units in those regions hardest hit by Karmaliuk. He was caught four times and sentenced to hard labor in Siberia, but escaped each time, returning to Lityn and Letychiv districts. A tower in the Kamianets-Podilskyi Castle bears the name of its famous prisoner.

==== Openness towards other ethnicities ====
Karmaliuk bore no ill will towards the poor of all ethnic groups and minorities in Ukraine, Jews in particular, and as a result they supported him en masse. His close companions were the Poles Jan and Alex Glembovski, Feliks Jankowski and Aleksander Wytwycki and Jews Avrum El Itzkovych, Abrashko Duvydovych Sokolnytsky and Aron Viniar. Many Jews were prosecuted for participating in Karmaliuk's raids and aiding and abetting him. In general, Karmaliuk inspired unprecedented loyalty in all his supporters.

== Death ==
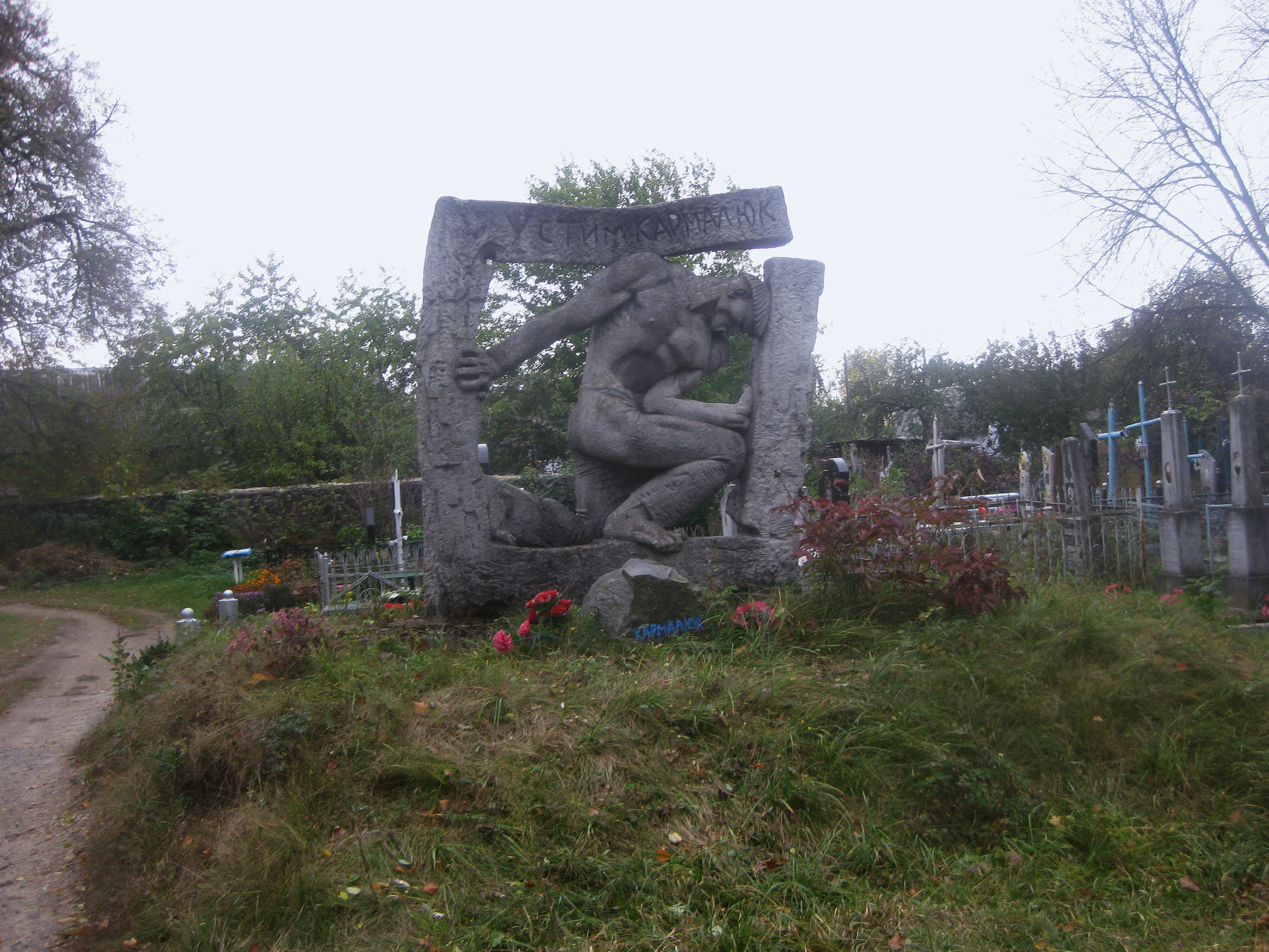
Ustym Karmaliuk grave

The sister of a woman called Uliana (or Olena), Varvara decided to testify against Karmaliuk. She informed the local landowners about Karmaliuk's next visit to Varvara, and they ambushed her house. Two of the party hid in the stove and one in the halls, providing an emergency exit through the roof. Two others were scared and decided to run through the roof. Haidamak is said to have enquired what the noise was, to which Uliana replied that the sheep were making noise. When the noise was repeated, Karmaliuk decided to check what was happening and looking out he saw a frightened nobleman, Rutkovsky, who shot him in the head out of fear.

According to legend, Karmaliuk was impervious to bullets, but he was killed by the only thing that could get him, a lead garment button.

== In art and literature ==
Karmalyuk is a subject of many art- and folk-songs. He is sometimes referred to as "the Houdini of Podilia", as no prison was able to hold him for very long. Affectionately, he is known as the last Haidamak of Ukraine.

Karmalyuk was the subject of three portraits by Russian painter Vasily Tropinin. There are a few different versions of Karmalyuk's acquaintance with the artist. According to one version Tropinin was introduced to Karmaliuk by his friend physician Prokopy Danylevsky, who had given medical help to Karmalyuk's people. According to another version, Tropinin painted Karmaliuk inside prison. Three portraits of Karmalyuk by Tropinin survive. One is kept in the Nizhny Tagil art museum, another in the Tretyakov Gallery and the third is in the Russian Museum.

Karmalyuk was the subject of a number of poems by the songwriter Tomasz Padura, some of which became folk songs.

Faust Lopatinsky directed the silent film "Karmalyuk" in 1931.

Literary works dedicated to Ustym Karmalyuk include:

- Marko Vovchok – a historic children novella Karmalyuk (in Ukrainian, 1865);
- Mykhailo Starytskyi – a novel in 2 volumes, Rogue Karmelyuk (in Russian, 1908) (Ukrainian translation, 1909);
- Dmytro Tiahnyhore – a four-act play, Karmalyuk (in Ukrainian, 1920);
- Liudmyla Starytska-Cherniakhivska – a five-act play, Rogue Karmelyuk (in Ukrainian, 1926);
- Stepan Vasylchenko – a three-act play – Rogue Karmelyuk (in Ukrainian, 1927);
- Vasyl Kucher – Ustym Karmalyuk (in Ukrainian, a novella in 1940, a novel in 1954, based on the 1940 novella);
- Ivan Drach – The Ballad of Karmalyuk – a poem included in his book Poems (in Ukrainian, 1967);
- Volodymyr Gzhytskyi – Karmalyuk (in Ukrainian, 1971);
- Oleksandr Hyzha – Siege of Karmalyuk (in Ukrainian, 1990).

== Bibliography ==
- Chapin, David A. and Weinstock, Ben, The Road from Letichev: The history and culture of a forgotten Jewish community in Eastern Europe, Volume 2. ISBN 0-595-00667-1 iUniverse, Lincoln, NE, 2000, pp. 465–468.
