= Jewish agricultural colonies in the Russian Empire =

Agricultural colonies made up of Jews in the Russian Empire

Jewish agricultural colonies in the Russian Empire, also referred to as individually as koloniia (pl. kolonii; Russian: колония) were first established in Kherson Governorate in 1806. The ukase of 9 December 1804 allowed Jews for the first time in Russia to purchase land for farming settlements. Jews were provided with various incentives: tax abatements, reduced land prices, and (after the 1827 decree on military conscription, which introduced it for the Jews) exemption from military service. Other colonies in New Russia and Western Krai followed. In 1835 an abortive attempt to establish Jewish colonies in Siberia was made. Another major colonization was initiated in Yekaterinoslav Governorate in 1846. In 1858, 18 Jewish agricultural colonies were registered in Podolia Governorate, involving over 1,100 families. One of the largest and most successful was Starozakrevskyi Maidan. By 1900, there were about 100,000 Jewish colonists throughout Russia.

In early 1890s, an English writer Arnold White visited the Kherson colonies to investigate the status of Russian Jews by commission from Baron Hirsch. He noted that colonies grew due to natural population increase since their inception, despite hardships, and that after 80 years, there was not enough land. He also noted that Jewish women were not permitted to do field work.

Jewish agricultural colonies became more successful than the Russian government initially expected. Some Jewish agricultural colonies turned into full-fledged Jewish shtetls with thriving merchant businesses not related to the agricultural activities originally chartered. Other kolonii became the centres for new cash crops such as sugar beets, winter wheat, or sunflowers, which particularly made Ukraine the breadbasket for all of Europe. The sugar-beet industry produced more sugar in Europe than any other source, until tropical sugar-cane crops took over in the 20th century. The Russian sugar-beet industry was controlled by Jewish families associated with the Jewish agricultural colonies, such as the wealthy Brodsky family, financial magnates based in Kiev.

Russian Jewish agricultural colonies became models for communal agricultural efforts worldwide. Karl Marx cited the kolonii as examples of workers taking control and lifting themselves up through hard work. Zionists in the early 20th century used Russian kolonii as models for kibbutzim in Israel, particularly in the Second Aliyah after 1904. After the Russian Revolution of 1917, the Bolshevik government carried out collectivization efforts during 1920–1938 (see Komzet and OZET). Many kolonii became kolkhozes during this period.

== See also ==
- Am Olam
- History of the Jews in Ukraine
- Jewish agricultural colonies of Bessarabia
- Jewish Colonization Association
- Jewish gauchos
- Kibbutz
- Kolonja Izaaka
- The Jewish Steppe

== Bibliography ==
- Chapin, David A. and Weinstock, Ben, The Road from Letichev: The History and Culture of a Forgotten Jewish Community in Eastern Europe, Volume 1. ISBN 0-595-00666-3 iUniverse, Lincoln, NE, 2000. (Chapter 9 "The Jewish Farmers of Podolia" provides a very detailed history of Jewish agricultural colonies.)
