= Derazhnia Raion =

Former subdivision of Khmelnytskyi Oblast, Ukraine

Derazhnia Raion Деражнянський район
- Raion
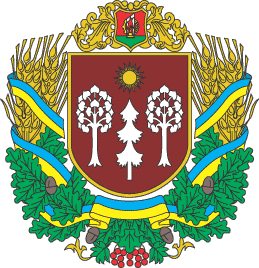
- Flag Coat of arms

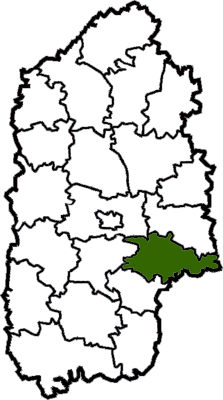
- Coordinates: 49°13′13″N 27°27′52″E
- Country: Ukraine
- Region: Khmelnytskyi Oblast
- Established: 7 March 1923
- Disestablished: 18 July 2020
- Admin. center: Derazhnia
- Subdivisions: List: 1 — city councils; 2 — settlement councils; 27 — rural councils; Number of localities: 1 — cities; 2 — urban-type settlements; 59 — villages; 0 — rural settlements

Government
  - Governor: Liudmila Striletska (PR)

Area
  - Total: 910 km^{2} (350 sq mi)

Population (2020)
  - Total: 30,458 ▼
  - Density: 33/km^{2} (87/sq mi)
- Time zone: UTC+02:00 (EET)
  - Summer (DST): UTC+03:00 (EEST)
- Postal index: 32200—32264
- Area code: +380 3856

Derazhnia Raion (Ukrainian: Деражнянський район, Derazhnians'kyi raion) was one of the 20 administrative raions (a district) of Khmelnytskyi Oblast in western Ukraine. Its administrative center was located in the city of Derazhnia. Its population was 38,289 in the 2001 Ukrainian Census. The raion was abolished on 18 July 2020 as part of the administrative reform of Ukraine, which reduced the number of raions of Khmelnytskyi Oblast to three. The area of Derazhnia Raion was merged into Khmelnytskyi Raion. The last estimate of the raion population was 30,458 (2020 est.)

== Geography ==
Derazhnia Raion was located in the central-eastern part of the Khmelnytskyi Oblast, corresponding to the modern-day boundaries of the Podolia historical region. Its total area constituted 910 square kilometres (350 mi^{2}). To its south and east, the raion bordered upon the neighboring Vinnytsia and Zhytomyr Oblasts, respectively.

== Subdivisions ==
At the time of disestablishment, the raion consisted of two hromadas:

- Derazhnia urban hromada with the administration in Derazhnia;
- Vovkovyntsi settlement hromada with the administration in the urban-type settlement of Vovkovyntsi.

== History ==
Derazhnia Raion was first established on March 7, 1923, as part of a full-scale administrative reorganization of the Ukrainian Soviet Socialist Republic. During the same reorganization the Vovkovyntsi Raion was created with its administrative center in Vovkovyntsi, which existed until it was merged with the Derazhnia Raion in 1958.

== Administrative divisions ==
Derazhnia Raion was divided in a way that follows the general administrative scheme in Ukraine. Local government was also organized along a similar scheme nationwide. Consequently, raions were subdivided into councils, which were the prime level of administrative division in the country.

Each of the raion's urban localities administered their own councils, often containing a few other villages within its jurisdiction. However, only a handful of rural localities were organized into councils, which also might contain a few villages within its jurisdiction.

Accordingly, Derazhnia Raion was divided into:

- 1 city council—made up of the city of Derazhnia (administrative center)
- 2 settlement councils—made up of the urban-type settlements of Vovkovyntsi and Lozove
- 27 village councils

Overall, the raion had a total of 62 populated localities, consisting of one city, two urban-type settlements, and 59 villages.
