= Vovkovyntsi =

Rural locality in Khmelnytskyi Oblast, Ukraine

Vovkovyntsi Вовковинці
- Rural settlement
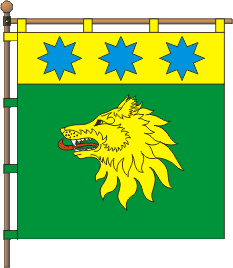
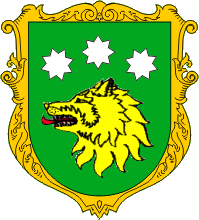
- Flag Coat of arms

- Location within Khmelnytskyi Oblast Location within Ukraine
- Coordinates: 49°12′18″N 27°39′22″E
- Country: Ukraine
- Oblast: Khmelnytskyi Oblast
- Raion: Khmelnytskyi Raion
- Hromada: Vovkovyntsi settlement hromada
- Founded: 1659
- Town status: 1957

Area
  - Total: 0.007 km^{2} (0.0027 sq mi)
- Elevation: 360 m (1,180 ft)

Population (2022)
  - Total: 2,367 ▼
  - Density: 340,000/km^{2} (880,000/sq mi)
- Time zone: UTC+2 (EET)
  - Summer (DST): UTC+3 (EEST)
- Postal code: 32223
- Area code: +380 3856
- Website: http://rada.gov.ua/

Vovkovyntsi (Ukrainian: Вовковинці) is a rural settlement in Khmelnytskyi Raion, Khmelnytskyi Oblast, western Ukraine. It hosts the administration of Vovkovyntsi settlement hromada, one of the hromadas of Ukraine. The settlement's population was 2,909 as of the 2001 Ukrainian Census. Current population: 2,367 (2022 estimate).

== History ==
Vovkovyntsi was founded in 1659, and it received the status of an urban-type settlement in 1957.

Until 18 July 2020, Vovkovyntsi belonged to Derazhnia Raion. The raion was abolished in July 2020 as part of the administrative reform of Ukraine, which reduced the number of raions of Khmelnytskyi Oblast to three. The area of Derazhnia Raion was merged into Khmelnytskyi Raion.

Until 26 January 2024, Vovkovyntsi was designated urban-type settlement. On this day, a new law entered into force which abolished this status, and Vovkovyntsi became a rural settlement.

== See also ==
- Lozove, the other urban-type settlement in the Derazhnia Raion of Khmelnytskyi Oblast
