= List of villages in Khmelnytskyi Oblast =

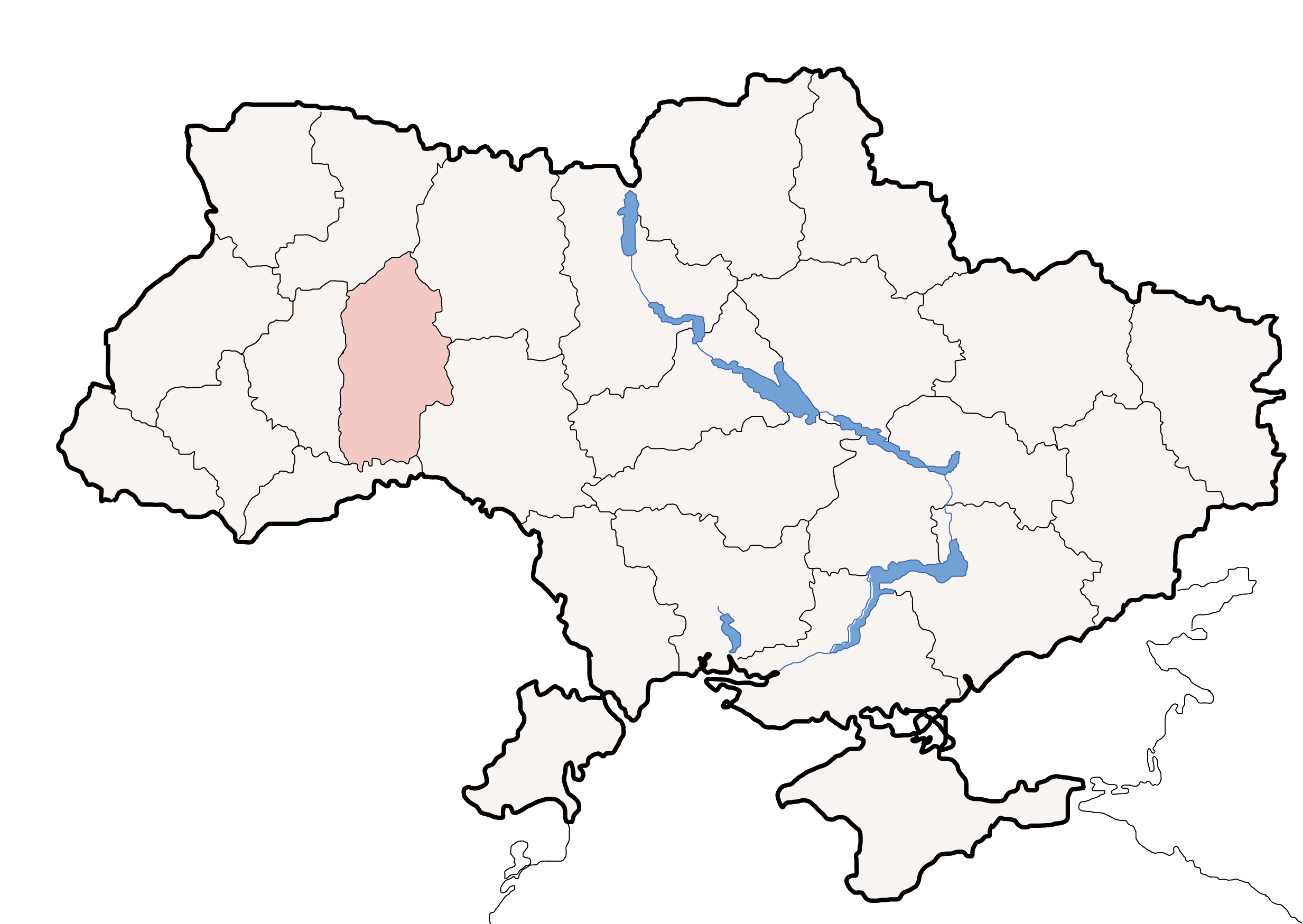
Map of the Khmelnytskyi Oblast

The following is a list of villages in Khmelnytskyi Oblast in Ukraine, categorised by Raion.

== Kamianets-Podilskyi Raion (Кам'янець-Подільський район) ==
- Abrykosivka
- Andriyivka
- Antonivka
- Bakota
- Dovzhok
- Orynyn
- Hukiv
- Kutkivtsi
- Letava
- Antonivka
- Balyn
- Makiv
- Mynkivtsi

== Khmelnytskyi Raion (Хмельницький район) ==
- Andriykivtsi
- Antonivka
- Adamivka (Derazhnia urban hromada)
- Adamivka (Zinkiv rural hromada)
- Hruzevytsia
- Hvardiyske
- Lisovi Hrynivtsi
- Oleshyn
- Sharovechka
- Staryі Maidan
- Andriyivka
- Balakyry
- Chornyvody
- Klynove
- Kupyn
- Lisovody
- Bahlayky
- Pirogovtsy
- Kuzmyn
- Stavnytsia
- Andronivka
- Pyliava
- Adampil
- Antonivka
- Berezhyntsi
- Svyatets
- Volytsia-Pol’ova
- Balky
- Avratyn
- Kholodets
- Kupil
- Andriyivka
- Solobkivtsi

== Shepetivka Raion (Шепетівський район) ==
- Vachiv
- Velykyy Pravutyn
- Velykyy Sknyt
- Veselynivka
- Volytsya
- Hannopil
- Hlynnyky
- Holyky
- Holovli
- Horytsya
- Kolom'ye
- Komarivka
- Krasnosilka
- Krasnostav
- Krupets
- Kutky
- Lysyche
- Malyy Pravutyn
- Malyy Sknyt
- Maniatyn
- Marachivka
- Mynkivtsi
- Myrutyn
- Myhaylivka
- Modestivka
- Muhariv
- Narayivka
- Nyzhni Holovli
- Novyy Kryvyn
- Puzyrky
- Rivky
- Romaniny
- Selychiv
- Shaternyky
- Shevchenka
- Staryі Kryvyn
- Yablunivka
- Stara Hutys'ka
- Storonyche
- Svyrydy
- Syvir
- Shchurivchyky
- Shchurivtsi
- Tarasivka
- Telizhyntsi
- Ternavka
- Topirchyky
- Topory
- Tyshevychi
- Vas'kivtsi
- Velyka Radohoshch
- Velyki Puzyrky
- Vlashanivka
- Zabrid
- Zakruzhtsi
- Zakrynychne
- Zarichchja
- Zavadyntsi
- Zubari
- Adamiv
- Novoselytsia
- Bachmanivka
- Berezdiv
- Besidky
- Dovzhky
- Varvarivka
- Baymaky
- Berezne
- Horodysche
- Sudylkiv
- Varyvidky
- Antonivka
- Bejzymy
- Bilogorodka
- Bilchyn
- Bilchynka
- Bileve
- Bilotyn
- Bilyzhynci
- Borysiv
- Cheptsi
- Chyzhivka
- Dan'kivtsi
- Dertka
- Dibrivka
- Dobryn
- Dolochchia
- Dvirets'
- Havrulivka
- Hryhorivka
- Ivanivka
- Kaletyntsi
- Kalynivka
- Kamianka
- Khoten' Druhyi
- Khoten' Pershyi
- Khrystivka
- Kindratky
- Klubivka
- Komyny
- Kropyvna
- Kryvoluka
- Kuniv
- Ljutarka
- Lisna
- Lishchany
- Lopushne
- Mala Medvedivka
- Mala Radohoshch
- Mjakoty
- Mokrets'
- Mykhlia
- Mykhajlivka
- Mykhniv
- Myrne
- Mysljatyn
- Nechajivka
- Novosilka
- Novostav
- Nova Hutys'ka
- Nove Selo
- Pidlistsi
- Pivneva Hora
- Pluzhne
- Pokoshchivka
- Poдis'ke
- Pryputenka
- Pryputni
- Putryntsi
- Pyl'ky
- Radoshivka
- Revucha
- Ripky
- Rokytne
- Sachnivtsi
- Shekeryntsi
- Shevchenko
- Smorshky
- Sohuzhyntsi
- Soshne
