= Dovzhky, Khmelnytskyi Oblast =

Rural locality in Khmelnytskyi Oblast, Ukraine

Dovzhky, Slavuta Raion Довжки (Славутський район)
- Village
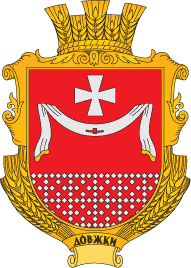
- Flag Coat of arms

- Location within Khmelnytskyi Oblast
- Coordinates: 50°30′12″N 26°54′20″E
- Country: Ukraine
- Oblast: Khmelnytskyi Oblast
- District: Shepetivka Raion
- Established: 1594

Area
  - Total: 436 km^{2} (168 sq mi)
- Elevation /(average value of): 228 m (748 ft)

Population
  - Total: 952
  - Density: 2.18/km^{2} (5.66/sq mi)
- Time zone: UTC+2 (EET)
  - Summer (DST): UTC+3 (EEST)
- Postal code: 30022
- Area code: +380 3842
- Website: село Довжки, райцентр Славута ^{(Ukrainian)}

Dovzhky (Ukrainian: До́вжки, alternative name – Ukrainian: Должок, Довжок) – village (selo) in Shepetivka Raion of Khmelnytskyi Oblast, Ukraine. It belongs to Hannopil rural hromada, one of the hromadas of Ukraine. Area of the village totals is 4,36 km^{2} and the population of the village is about 952 people. Local government is administered by Dovzhkivska village council.

== Geography ==
This village is located on the altitude of 228 metres (750 ft) above sea level. It is a flat terrain at a distance 147 kilometres (91 mi) from the regional center of Khmelnytskyi, 30 kilometres (19 mi) from the district center Slavuta and 21 kilometres (13 mi) from the Berezdiv.

== History ==
The first written sources of the village have been preserved from the years 1594-1595. But in territory of village are found tools copper-stone age ) (3rd millennium BC).
Direction of the economy of the local population – agriculture and meat dairy farming.

Before the Second World War the population of village Dovzhky was about 2,000 people and was a few Jewish families. A terrible fate awaited the Jews of Slavuta district during the fascist occupation of 1941 – 1942. All of them were taken to ghetto and killed by the Nazis.

Until 18 July 2020, Dovzhky belonged to Slavuta Raion. The raion was abolished in July 2020 as part of the administrative reform of Ukraine, which reduced the number of raions of Khmelnytskyi Oblast to three. The area of Slavuta Raion was abolished and merged into Shepetivka Raion.
