= Yablunivka, Shepetivka Raion, Khmelnytskyi Oblast =

Rural locality in Khmelnytskyi Oblast, Ukraine

Yablunivka Яблунівка
- Village
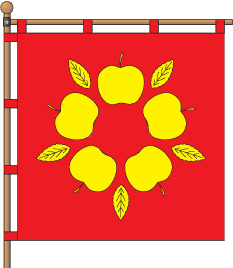
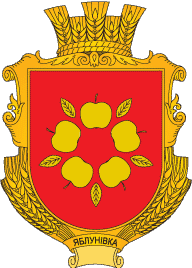
- Flag Coat of arms

- Location within Khmelnytskyi Oblast
- Coordinates: 50°23′23″N 27°13′25″E
- Country: Ukraine
- Oblast: Khmelnytskyi Oblast
- Raion: Shepetivka Raion

Area
  - Total: 288 km^{2} (111 sq mi)
- Elevation: 224 m (735 ft)

Population (2009)
  - Total: 567
  - Density: 1.97/km^{2} (5.10/sq mi)
- Time zone: UTC+2 (EET)
  - Summer (DST): UTC+3 (EEST)
- Postal code: 30087
- Area code: +380 3842
- Website: село Манятин ^{(Ukrainian)}

Yablunivka (Ukrainian: Яблуні́вка) is a village in Shepetivka Raion (district) of Khmelnytskyi Oblast (province) in western Ukraine. The village is located in the north of Khmelnytskyi Oblast, on the border from the Zhytomyr Oblast. It belongs to Berezdiv rural hromada, one of the hromadas of Ukraine. The population of the village is around 567 persons.

It is situated 141 kilometres (88 mi) from the regional center Khmelnytskyi, 49 kilometres (30 mi) from the city of Slavuta, and 43 kilometres (27 mi) from the city of Shepetivka, the raion center.

Until 18 July 2020, Yablunivka belonged to Slavuta Raion. The raion was abolished in July 2020 as part of the administrative reform of Ukraine, which reduced the number of raions of Khmelnytskyi Oblast to three. The area of Slavuta Raion was abolished and merged into Shepetivka Raion.

The Maniatynska village council forms the local government. The regional psychiatric hospital is located in the village.
