= Maniatyn =

Rural locality in Khmelnytskyi Oblast, Ukraine

Maniatyn Манятин
- Village
- Location within Khmelnytskyi Oblast
- Coordinates: 50°25′35″N 27°13′26″E
- Country: Ukraine
- Oblast: Khmelnytskyi Oblast
- District: Shepetivka Raion
- Established: 1577

Area
  - Total: 191 km^{2} (74 sq mi)
- Elevation /(average value of): 222 m (728 ft)

Population
  - Total: 520
  - Density: 2.7/km^{2} (7.1/sq mi)
- Time zone: UTC+2 (EET)
  - Summer (DST): UTC+3 (EEST)
- Postal code: 30086
- Area code: +380 3842
- Website: село Манятин ^{(Ukrainian)}

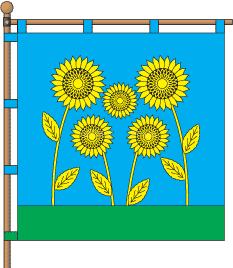
Flag of the village of Manyatyn

Maniatyn (Ukrainian: Маня́тин) – a small village in Shepetivka Raion (district) of Khmelnytskyi Oblast (province) in Ukraine, that is located in the north of Khmelnytskyi Oblast, on the border from the Zhytomyr Oblast. It belongs to Berezdiv rural hromada, one of the hromadas of Ukraine.

Area of the village is only 1.91 km^{2}, and the population of the village is about 520 people. Local government is administered by Maniatynska village council.

== Geography ==
The village is located at a distance of 31 kilometres (19 mi) from the highway in European route E40 E40 connecting Lviv with Kyiv (the road to the nearest town Korets). Distance from the regional center of Khmelnytskyi is 147 kilometres (91 mi) and 46 kilometres (29 mi) from the district center of Slavuta.

== History ==
The village of Maniatyn was first mentioned in 1577 as property Konstanty Wasyl Ostrogski. After World War I the village was part of the Ukrainian People's Republic (1917 - 1919). After the 1919 of Treaty of Versailles and by 1991 – in composition of USSR.

Until 18 July 2020, Maniatyn belonged to Slavuta Raion. The raion was abolished in July 2020 as part of the administrative reform of Ukraine, which reduced the number of raions of Khmelnytskyi Oblast to three. The area of Slavuta Raion was abolished and merged into Shepetivka Raion.

== Literature ==
- Історія міст і сіл Української РСР. Хмельницька область. — К.: Головна редакція УРЕ АН УРСР, 1971., Славутський, Адм. Устрій, Манятинська сільська рада, с. Манятин (in Ukrainian)
