= Battle of Strygany =

1944 battle in Ukraine

- Part of the Eastern Front (World War II) and Soviet–Ukrainian partisan conflict (1941–1944)
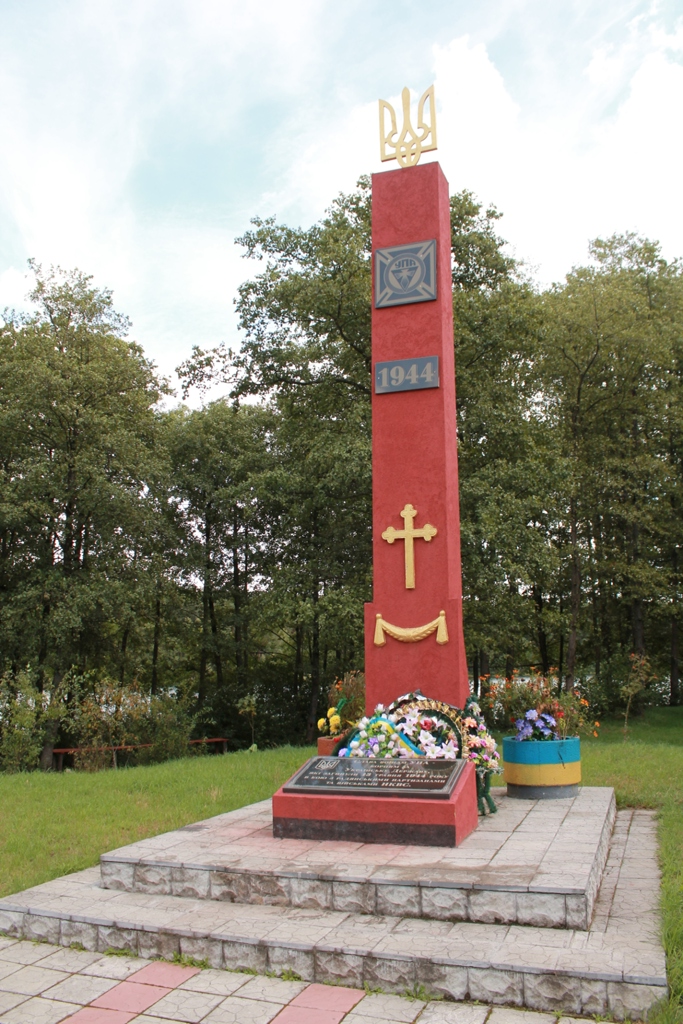
- Monument to dead UPA fighters in Strygany
Date	12–13 May 1944
Location	Strygany, Slavuta Raion, Khmelnytskyi Oblast
Result	Soviet victory

Belligerents
Ukrainian partisans NKVD	Ukrainian Insurgent Army

Commanders and leaders
Anton Odukha	Mykola Svystun

Strength
300 partisans (Note: NKVD reinforcements arrived later.)	200–320

Casualties and losses
Unknown	83–127 killed 28–30 captured

The Battle of Strygany took place during the Ukrainian Insurgent Army (UPA) attack on Soviet partisans and subsequent arrival of NKVD reinforcements, on 12–13 May 1944.

== Prelude ==
During the second half of 1943–1944, UPA carried out propaganda activity in Central Ukraine, in attempts to create OUN cells there and spread influence. The UPA sotnia of Mykola Svystun was tasked with breaking through to Kholodny Yar in order to assist local insurgents there. The UPA sotnia entered Slavuta Raion, where they were informed by locals about presence of the Soviet partisans of Anton Odukha, numbering 300 partisans. Estimates of UPA strength vary at 200–320.

== Battle ==
On May 12, the Soviet partisans were informed of UPA movement by their outpost, which allowed them to react on time. The UPA insurgents and Soviet partisans clashed for half an hour, but the arrival of NKVD reinforcements forced the UPA sotnia to retreat into the forest near Bryduryn. According to Odukha, UPA lost 70 troops in this clash.

On May 13, the Soviet forces attacked UPA's defensive line near Bryduryn. Some UPA units managed to break out with casualties, while others took advantage of environment and Soviet disorganization. However, half of UPA troops were unable to break out and were defeated in swap near Bryduryn.

== Aftermath ==
The battle ended in Soviet victory and forced the surviving UPA units to retreat. According to Odukha's report, UPA suffered 127 killed and 28 captured. Other sources estimate UPA losses at 83–102 killed and 30 captured.

According to eyewitness accounts, 7 UPA captives were executed on Odukha's order, while the rest were sent off under the guard of NKVD and given various prison sentences. Soviet authorities learnt about UPA's planned propaganda activities in Eastern regions after interrogating prisoners.

== Legacy ==
In June 1992, dead UPA fighters were honored with a memorial in the form of metal cross. On 18 August, a larger monument was built at Strygany in the form of trident.

== Bibliography ==
- Руцький, Микола (2010). Діяльність ОУН і УПА на Славутчині (1941 – 1949 рр.) (in Ukrainian). Vol. 16. Університет "Острозька академія". ISBN 966-7631-62-1.
- Михайлов, Ф. М. (2015). Джерела до історії партизанського з'єднання (in Russian). Kyiv: Центр дослідження історії Поділля Інституту історії України НАН України. ISBN 978-966-1502-77-1.
