= Hrytsiv =

Rural locality in Khmelnytskyi Oblast, Ukraine

Hrytsiv Гриців
- Rural settlement
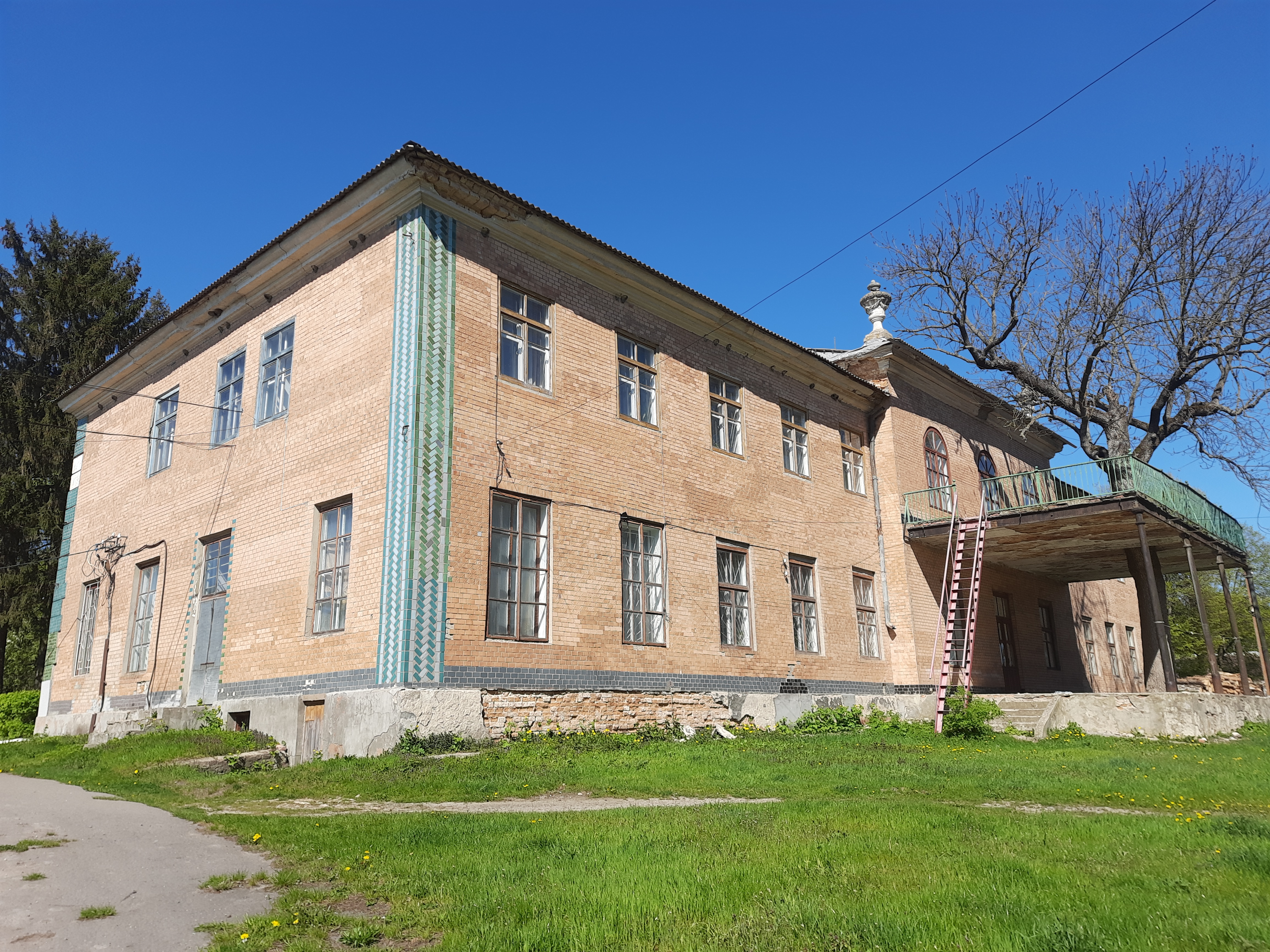
- Grocholski Palace in Hrytsiv

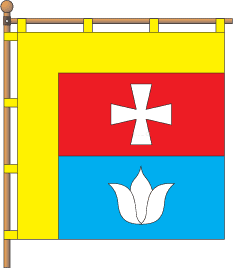
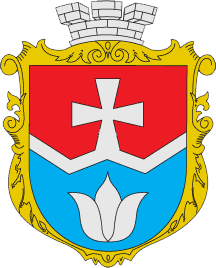
- Flag Coat of arms

- Location of Hrytsiv in Khmelnytskyi Oblast
- Coordinates: 49°58′24″N 27°13′40″E
- Country: Ukraine
- Oblast: Khmelnytskyi Oblast
- Raion: Shepetivka Raion
- Hromada: Hrytsiv settlement hromada
- Founded: 1230
- Town status: 1959

Area
  - Total: 4.0 km^{2} (1.5 sq mi)
- Elevation: 267 m (876 ft)

Population (2022)
  - Total: 3,416 ▼
  - Density: 850/km^{2} (2,200/sq mi)
- Time zone: UTC+2 (EET)
  - Summer (DST): UTC+3 (EEST)
- Postal code: 30455
- Area code: +380 3840
- Website: http://rada.gov.ua/

Hrytsiv (Ukrainian: Гриців) is a rural settlement in Shepetivka Raion, Khmelnytskyi Oblast, western Ukraine. It hosts the administration of Hrytsiv settlement hromada, one of the hromadas of Ukraine. The settlement's population was 4,056 as of the 2001 Ukrainian Census and 3,416 (2022 estimate).

== Geography ==
Hrytsiv is located upon the Khomora River, a tributary of the Sluch.

== History ==
The settlement was founded in 1230. It received the status of an urban-type settlement in 1959. In Soviet times it served as a district centre.

Until 26 January 2024, Hrytsiv was designated urban-type settlement. On this day, a new law entered into force which abolished this status, and Hrytsiv became a rural settlement.
