= Krasnostav =

Krasnostav may refer to:

- Krasnostav, Slavuta Raion, Ukraine
- Ukrainian name of Krasnystaw, eastern Poland
