= Berezdiv rural hromada =

Berezdiv rural hromada Берездівська сільска громада
- Hromada
- Interactive map of Berezdiv rural hromada
- Country: Ukraine
- Oblast: Khmelnytskyi Oblast
- Raion: Shepetivka Raion

Area
  - Total: 318.3 km^{2} (122.9 sq mi)

Population
  - Total: 8,297
- Website: berezdivska-gromada.gov.ua

Berezdiv rural hromada (Ukrainian: Берездівська сільська громада) is one of the hromadas of Shepetivka Raion in Khmelnytskyi Oblast in Ukraine. Its administrative centre is the village of Berezdiv.

== Composition ==
The hromada encompasses 27 villages:

- Berezdiv (administrative centre)
- Besidky
- Diakiv
- Horytsia
- Khvoshchivka
- Krasnostav
- Krasnosilka
- Kutky
- Malyi Pravutyn
- Maniatyn
- Modestivka
- Mukhariv
- Myrutyn
- Mykhailivka
- Pechyvody
- Piddubtsi
- Ploska
- Selychiv
- Shahova
- Siomaky
- Stavychany
- Trostianets
- Ulianivka
- Velykyi Pravutyn
- Veselynivka
- Yablunivka
- Zubivshchyna
