= Berezdiv =

Rural locality in Khmelnytskyi Oblast, Ukraine

Berezdiv Берездів
- Village
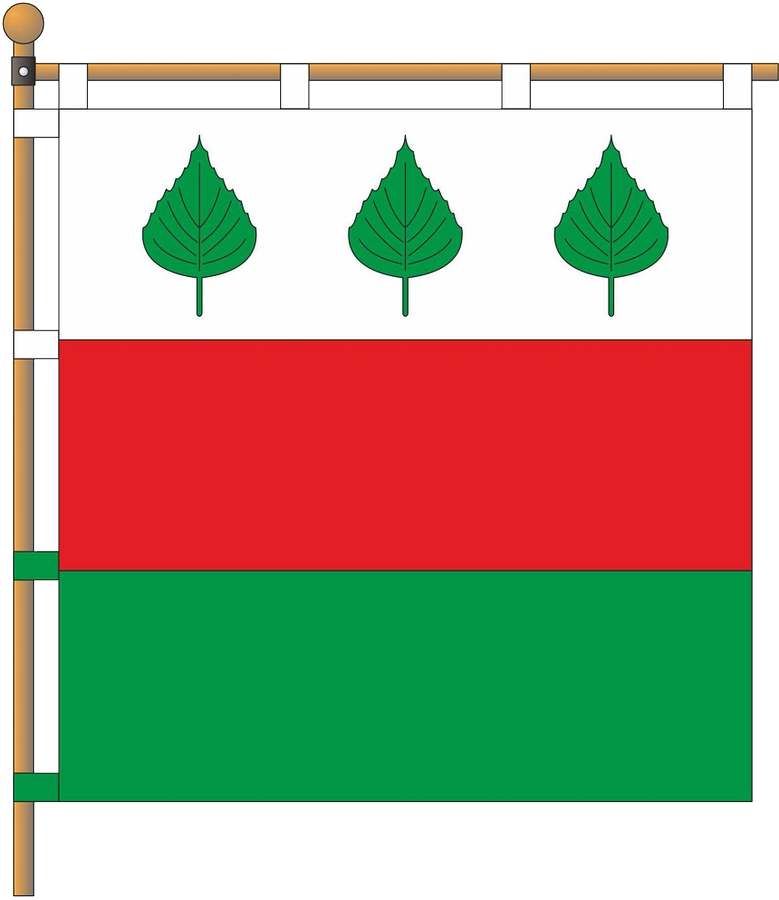
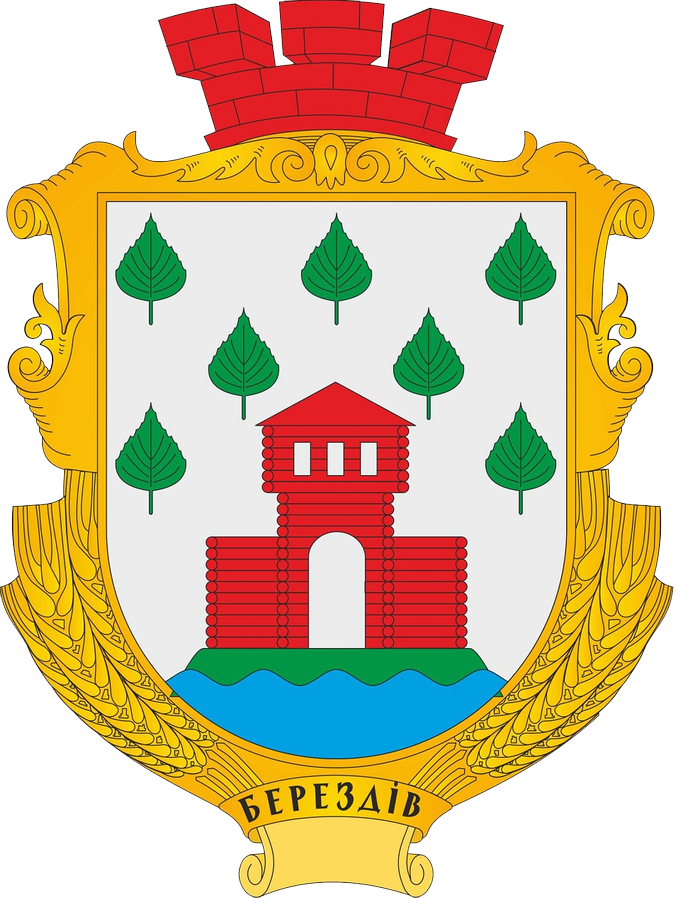
- Flag Coat of arms

- Location within Ukraine
- Coordinates: 50°27′21″N 27°7′10″E
- Country: Ukraine
- Oblast: Khmelnytskyi Oblast
- Raion: Shepetivka Raion
- Hromada: Berezdiv rural hromada
- Established: 1586

Area
  - Total: 273 km^{2} (105 sq mi)
- Elevation: 214 m (702 ft)

Population (2009)
  - Total: 1,372
  - Density: 5.03/km^{2} (13.0/sq mi)
- Time zone: UTC+2 (EET)
  - Summer (DST): UTC+3 (EEST)
- Postal code: 30053
- Area code: +380 3842

Berezdiv (Ukrainian: Берездів; Polish: Berezdów) is a village in Shepetivka Raion (district) of Khmelnytskyi Oblast (province) in western Ukraine. It hosts the administration of Berezdiv rural hromada, one of the hromadas of Ukraine. Population of Berezdiv is about 1,161 inhabitants. In Berezdiv is located school, Eastern Orthodox Church, Shepetivka Museum branch and three cemeteries: Eastern Orthodox, Catholic and Jewish.

== Geography ==
It is located by the rivers Korchik, Siechanka. 32 km North-East from Slavuta. 18 km South from Korets.

Berezdiv, at 50°28′N, 28°06′E, is situated at altitude of 210m.

== History ==
Until the second Partition of the Polish–Lithuanian Commonwealth Berezdiv belonged to the Crown of Polish Kingdom. Berezdiv goods belonged to Ostrozky, Chodkiewicz, Lubomirski and Jablonowski duke families. In 1775 Berezdiv was founded by Braclav voivode Jan Jablonowski, wooden Blessed Virgin Mary Church. In 1992 it was dismantled because of the state of emergency.

In 1831 Berezdiv had been confiscated by Russian Government.

At the end of the 19th century it was small town with a population of 590 people (306 of which were Jews).

In 1954 Berezdiv had lost town privileges, and became a village.

Until 18 July 2020, Berezdiv belonged to Slavuta Raion. The raion was abolished in July 2020 as part of the administrative reform of Ukraine, which reduced the number of raions of Khmelnytskyi Oblast to three. The area of Slavuta Raion was merged into Khmelnytskyi Raion.

== Bibliography ==
- Geographic Dictionary of the Polish Kingdom and other Slavic Countries, 1881
