= Vasyl Sviato =

Ukrainian politician (1948–2025)

Vasily Sviato
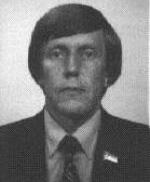
- Sviato in 1994

Member of the Verkhovna Rada
- In office 11 April 1994 – 12 April 1998

Personal details
- Born: Vasily Petrovich Sviato; 7 May 1948 Chemerivtsi Raion, Khmelnytskyi Oblast, Ukrainian SSR, USSR
- Died: 18 September 2025 (aged 77)
- Party: Independent

Vasily Petrovich Sviato (Ukrainian: Василь Петрович Свято; 7 May 1948 – 18 September 2025) was a Ukrainian politician. An independent, he served in the Verkhovna Rada from 1994 to 1998.

== Early life ==
Sviato was born on 7 May 1948 in the village of Kormilcha, which was then part of the Ukrainian SSR in the Soviet Union. In 1971, he graduated from the University of Kyiv with a specialty as a physicist-nuclear scientist. After graduation, he started working at the Institute for Nuclear Research of the Academy of Sciences of Ukraine. He eventually also started working for the Department of Atomic Energy Problems. In 1985, he received his PhD on the topic of nuclear excitation processes arising from positron-electron annihilation in atoms and the beta decay of odd tin isotopes.

== Political career ==
In the 1994 Ukrainian parliamentary election, he was elected in the second round to the Verkhovna Rada for electoral district no. 416, which is within Khmelnytskyi Oblast as a self-nominated candidate. During his time as an MP, he was Deputy Chair of the Committee on Nuclear Policy and Nuclear Safety and was a member of the faction for independents. He attempted to run for re-election in the 1998 elections for district no. 191, but lost. Following this, he became a Perennial candidate to the Verkhovna Rada until 2012, running mostly as a self-nominated candidate besides one endorsement from the "Green Planet" party in 2006.

== Personal life and death ==
He was married and had one son born in 1973 and a daughter born in 1983.

Sviato died on 18 September 2025, at the age of 77.
