= Starokostiantyniv Raion =

Former subdivision of Khmelnytskyi Oblast, Ukraine

Starokostiantyniv Raion Старокостянтинівський район
- Raion
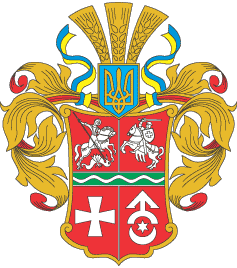
- Flag Coat of arms

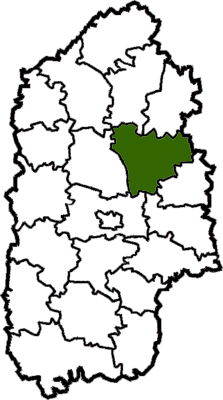
- Coordinates: 49°45′20″N 27°13′15″E
- Country: Ukraine
- Region: Khmelnytskyi Oblast
- Established: 7 March 1923
- Disestablished: 18 July 2020
- Admin. center: Starokostiantyniv
- Subdivisions: List: 0 — city councils; 0 — settlement councils; 30 — rural councils; Number of localities: 0 — cities; 0 — urban-type settlements; 97 — villages; 0 — rural settlements

Government
  - Governor: Ivan Ovchar (PR)

Area
  - Total: 1,210 km^{2} (470 sq mi)

Population (2020)
  - Total: 27,023 ▼
  - Density: 22.3/km^{2} (57.8/sq mi)
- Time zone: UTC+02:00 (EET)
  - Summer (DST): UTC+03:00 (EEST)
- Postal index: 31110—31183
- Area code: +380 3854
- Website: http://www.strkrada.km.ua

Starokostiantyniv Raion (Ukrainian: Старокостянтинівський район, Starokostiantynivs'kyi raion) was one of the 20 administrative raions (a district) of Khmelnytskyi Oblast in western Ukraine. Its administrative center was located in the city of Starokostiantyniv. Its population was 37,459 as of the 2001 Ukrainian Census. The raion was abolished on 18 July 2020 as part of the administrative reform of Ukraine, which reduced the number of raions of Khmelnytskyi Oblast to three. The area of Starokostiantyniv Raion was merged into Khmelnytskyi Raion. The last estimate of the raion population was 27,023 (2020 est.)

== History ==
Starokostiantyniv Raion was first established on March 7, 1923 as part of a full-scale administrative reorganization of the Ukrainian Soviet Socialist Republic. It was located in the central part of Khmelnytskyi Oblast, corresponding to the modern-day boundaries of the Volhynia and Podolia historical regions.

During 1998-2001, the raion went through an administrative reorganization. Namely, the city of Starokostiantyniv was removed from the raion's jurisdiction and its status was upgraded to that of a city of oblast significance under the jurisdiction of Khmelnytskyi Oblast. Even though it was no longer a part of the raion, Starokostiantyniv still served as its administrative center. At the same time, three new village councils were also established.

== Subdivisions ==
At the time of disestablishment, the raion consisted of three hromadas:

- Myroliubne rural hromada with the administration in the selo of Myroliubne;
- Starokostiantyniv urban hromada with the administration in Starokostiantyniv, together with the city of oblast significance of Starokostiantyniv;
- Staryi Ostropil rural hromada with the administration in the selo of Staryi Ostropil.

Starokostiantyniv Raion was divided in a way that followed the general administrative scheme in Ukraine. Local government was also organized along a similar scheme nationwide. Consequently, raions were subdivided into councils, which were the prime level of administrative division in the country.

Each of the raion's urban localities administered their own councils, often containing a few other villages within its jurisdiction. However, only a handful of rural localities were organized into councils, which also might contain a few villages within its jurisdiction.

Accordingly, the Starokostiantyniv Raion was divided into:

- 30 village councils

Overall, the raion had a total of 97 populated localities, all of which are villages.

== Places of interest ==
- Starokostiantyniv Castle

== Notable people ==
- Dariya Nikitichna Dobroczajeva (1916-1995), botanist, university teacher
