= History of the Jews in Krasnostav =

Village in Slavuta Raion, Khmelnytsky Oblast, Ukraine

Coordinates: 50°24′N 27°11′E

Jewish settlement in Krasnostav (Polish: Krasnystaw), Ukraine began in the 18th century. By the late 19th century, Jews constituted a majority of the population. Throughout periods of armed conflict, the Jews population was often attacked by combatants. Almost all of the town's Jewish residents were killed by invading German forces in 1941.

== Jewish history ==
Krasnostav is called Krasnystaw in Polish. Jewish settlement in Krasnostav began in the 18th century. In 1897 there were 1,222 Jews, who comprised 55.7 percent of the total population. Most Jews lived near the town center, where there were two synagogues. During an episode during the Russian Civil War, 31 Jews were wounded.

Throughout the Soviet-Polish War and World War I, Jewish civilians were attacked by combatants on all sides of the conflict. This led to the town forming an armed self-defense group to try to protect the shtetl from attack. From the early 1920s a Yiddish school operated in the town.

Conditions stabilized for a time, but economic depression led many Jews living in shtetls to seek out better opportunities in larger cities. Most of those who remained declined to leave during World War II when they learned that the German army would be invading. They thought the rumors of rampant antisemitism among German forces were merely propaganda, as many remembered the German soldiers of the previous World War somewhat positively. In 1941, invading German forces opened fire on the Jews of Krasnostav, leaving only two survivors, one of whom later wrote a memoir about her experience.
