= Slavuta Raion =

Former subdivision of Khmelnytskyi Oblast, Ukraine

Slavuta Raion Славутський район
- Raion
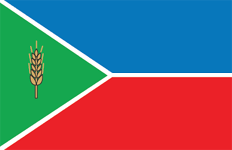
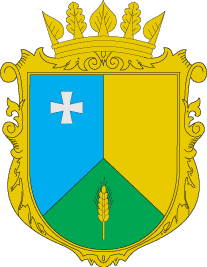
- Flag Coat of arms

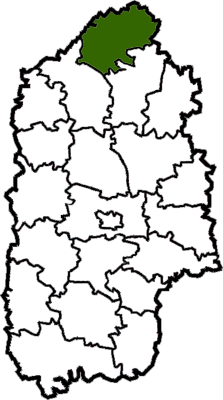
- Coordinates: 50°23′32″N 26°56′58″E
- Country: Ukraine
- Region: Khmelnytskyi Oblast
- Established: 1923, 1959
- Disestablished: 18 July 2020
- Admin. center: Slavuta
- Subdivisions: List: 0 — city councils; 0 — settlement councils; 36 — rural councils; Number of localities: 0 — cities; 0 — urban-type settlements; 79 — villages; 0 — rural settlements

Government
  - Governor: Vasyl V. Kardash

Area
  - Total: 1,162 km^{2} (449 sq mi)

Population (2020)
  - Total: 28,018
  - Density: 24.11/km^{2} (62.45/sq mi)
- Time zone: UTC+02:00 (EET)
  - Summer (DST): UTC+03:00 (EEST)
- Postal index: 30014—30087
- Area code: 380-3842
- Website: www.slavuta-rda.com

Slavuta Raion (Ukrainian: Славутський район) was a raion of Khmelnytskyi Oblast in Ukraine. Its administrative center was Slavuta which was incorporated separately as city of oblast significance and did not belong to the raion. It was established in 1923. 79 villages were located in Slavuta Raion. The raion was abolished on 18 July 2020 as part of the administrative reform of Ukraine, which reduced the number of raions of Khmelnytskyi Oblast to three. The area of Slavuta Raion was merged into Shepetivka Raion. The last estimate of the raion population was 28,018 (2020 est.)

== Geography ==
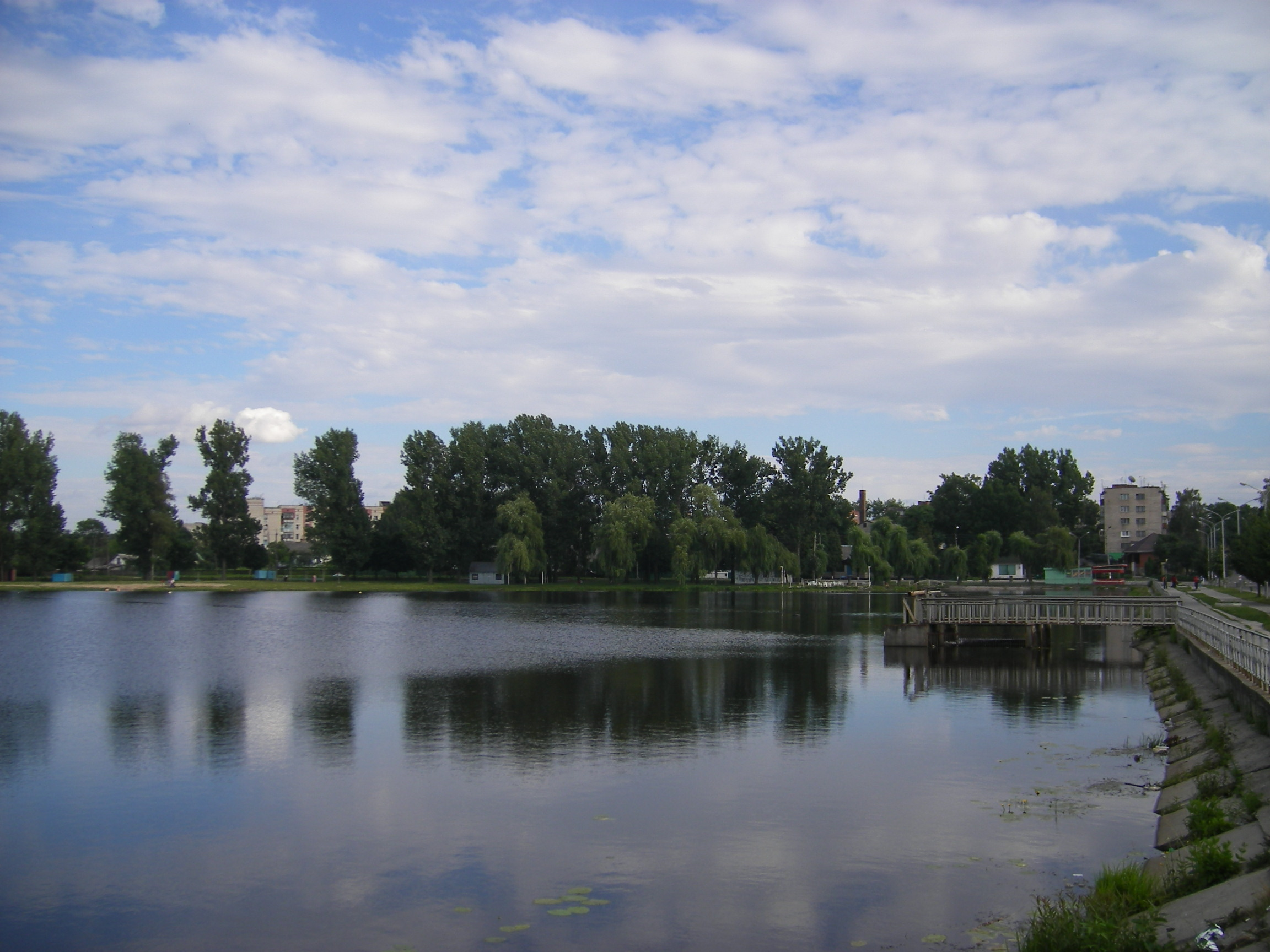
Quay in Slavuta.

Slavuta Raion was a part of Volhynia. It was one out 20 Raions of Khmelnytskyi Oblast. It was a large raion and ranked as the 7th among the largest with respect to the total area (1 162 km² corresponding to 5.6% of the total area of Khmelnytskyi Oblast).

Slavuta Raion was southeast of Rivne Oblast (Ostroh Raion, Hoshcha Raion and Korets Raion), southwest of Zhytomyr Oblast (Novohrad-Volynskyi Raion and Baranivka Raion), northwest of Shepetivka Raion, and northeast of Iziaslav Raion. The Horyn, Korchyk, Tsvitoha and other rivers flowed through the district. There was a rail line through the district (Shepetivka—Zdolbuniv).

== Subdivisions ==
At the time of disestablishment, the raion consisted of four hromadas:

- Berezdiv rural hromada with the administration in the selo of Berezdiv;
- Hannopil rural hromada with the administration in the selo of Hannopil;
- Krupets rural hromada with the administration in the selo of Krupets;
- Ulashanivka rural hromada with the administration in the selo of Ulashanivka.

== History ==
From 1923 to 1932 the district was part of Shepetivka region, then from 1932 to 1937 it was part of the Vinnytsia Oblast. Following that from 1937 to 1954 it was part of Kamenets Podolsk region. Since 1954 it has been part of Khmelnytskyi Oblast. Finally Slavuta Raion was formed September 23, 1959.
