= Shepetivka Raion =

Subdivision of Khmelnytskyi Oblast, Ukraine

Shepetivka Raion Шепетівський район
- Raion
- Flag Coat of arms

- Coordinates: 50°08′06″N 27°10′25″E
- Country: Ukraine
- Oblast: Khmelnytskyi Oblast
- Established: 1923
- Admin. center: Shepetivka
- Subdivisions: 18 hromadas

Government
  - Governor: Mykola S. Kovalchuk

Area
  - Total: 5,346 km^{2} (2,064 sq mi)

Population (2022)
  - Total: 276,735
  - Density: 51.76/km^{2} (134.1/sq mi)
- Time zone: UTC+02:00 (EET)
  - Summer (DST): UTC+03:00 (EEST)
- Postal index: 30410—30457
- Area code: 380-3840
- Website: www.sheprda.ho.ua

Shepetivka Raion (Ukrainian: Шепетівський район) is a raion in Khmelnytskyi Oblast in Ukraine. Its administrative center is Shepetivka. Its population is 276,735 (2022 estimate).

On 18 July 2020, as part of the administrative reform of Ukraine, the number of raions of Khmelnytskyi Oblast was reduced to three, and the area of Shepetivka Raion was significantly expanded. Four abolished raions, Bilohiria, Iziaslav, Polonne, and Slavuta Raions, as well as the cities of Netishyn, Slavuta, and Shepetivka, which were previously incorporated as a cities of oblast significance and did not belong to the raion, were merged into Shepetivka Raion. The January 2020 estimate of the raion population was 32,100 (2020 est.).

It was established in 1923. 1 urban-type settlement (Hrytsiv) and 68 villages were located in Shepetivka Raion until 2020.

== Geography ==
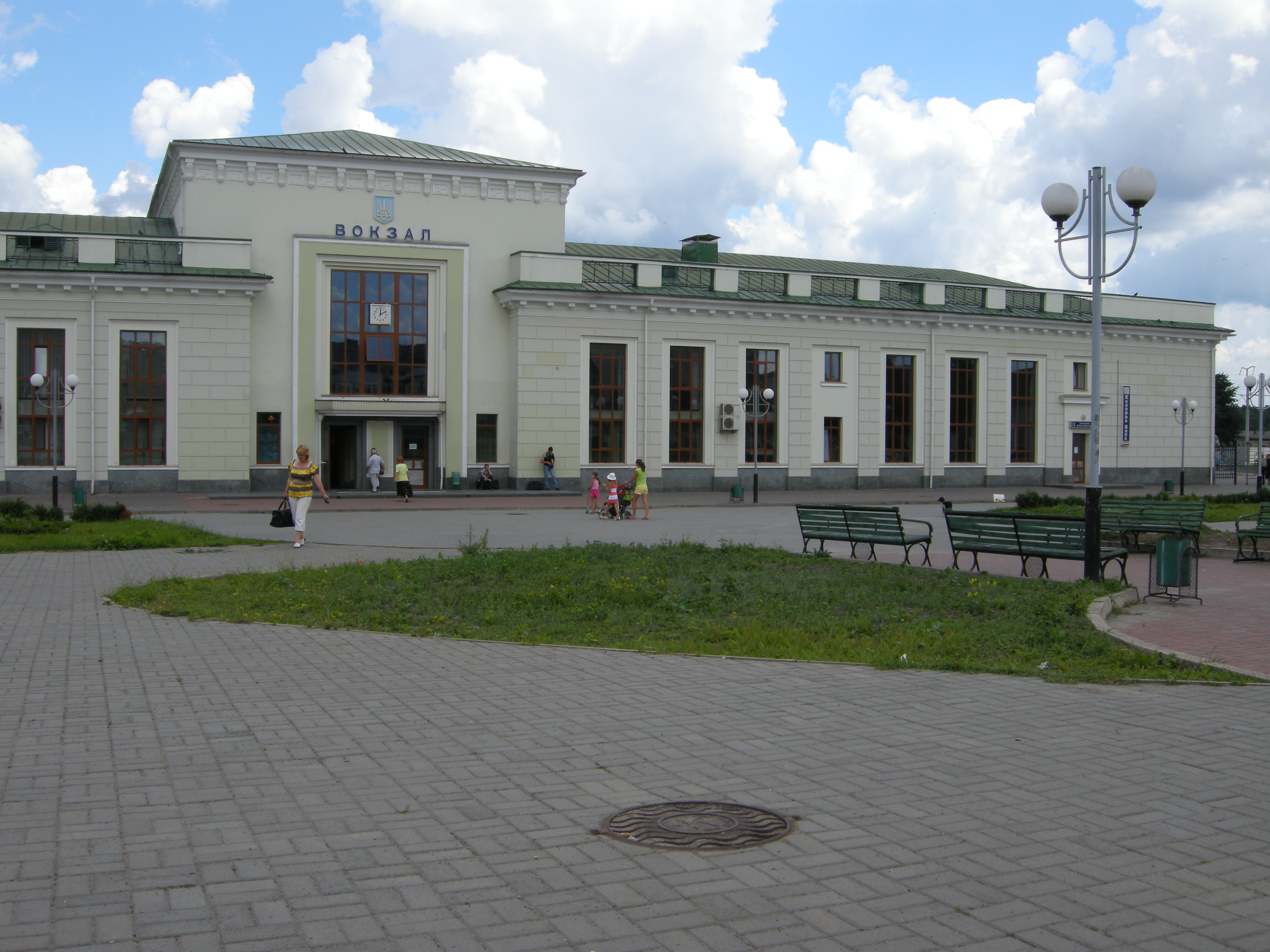
Train station Shepetivka

Shepetivka Region is a part of Volhynia. It is one out 20 Raions of Khmelnytskyi Oblast. It is a large Raion and ranks as the 8th among the largest with respect to the total area (1 160 km^{2} corresponding to 5.6% of the total area of Khmelnytskyi Oblast).

Shepetivka Raion is southeast of Slavuta Raion, southwest of Zhytomyr Oblast (Baranivka Raion), west of Polonne Raion, north of Starokostiantyniv Raion, and east of Iziaslav Raion. The Homora, Korchyk, Tsvitoha, Smilka and other rivers flow through the district. There are rail lines through the districts (Shepetivka—Slavuta—Zdolbuniv), Shepetivka—Iziaslav—Ternopil, Shepetivka—Starokostiantyniv, Shepetivka—Polonne and Shepetivka—Zviahel.

== Subdivisions ==
=== Current ===
After the reform in July 2020, the raion consisted of 18 hromadas:

- Berezdiv rural hromada with the administration in the selo of Berezdiv, transferred from Slavuta Raion;
- Bilohiria settlement hromada with the administration in the rural settlement of Bilohiria, transferred from Bilohiria Raion;
- Hannopil rural hromada with the administration in the selo of Hannopil, transferred from Slavuta Raion;
- Hrytsiv settlement hromada with the administration in the rural settlement of Hrytsiv, retained from Shepetivka Raion;
- Iziaslav urban hromada with the administration in the city of Iziaslav, transferred from Iziaslav Raion;
- Krupets rural hromada with the administration in the selo of Krupets, transferred from Slavuta Raion;
- Lenkivtsi rural hromada with the administration in the selo of Lenkivtsi, retained from Shepetivka Raion;
- Mykhailiuchka rural hromada with the administration in the selo of Mykhailiuchka, retained from Shepetivka Raion;
- Netishyn urban hromada with the administration in the city of Netishyn, transferred from the city of oblast significance of Netishyn;
- Pluzhne rural hromada with the administration in the selo of Pluzhne, transferred from Iziaslav Raion;
- Polonne urban hromada with the administration in the city of Polonne, transferred from Polonne Raion;
- Poninka settlement hromada with the administration in the rural settlement of Poninka, transferred from Polonne Raion;
- Sakhnivtsi rural hromada with the administration in the selo of Sakhnivtsi, transferred from Iziaslav Raion;
- Shepetivka urban hromada with the administration in the city of Shepetivka, transferred from the city of oblast significance of Shepetivka;
- Slavuta urban hromada with the administration in the city of Slavuta, transferred from the city of oblast significance of Slavuta;
- Sudylkiv rural hromada with the administration in the selo of Sudylkiv, retained from Shepetivka Raion;
- Ulashanivka rural hromada with the administration in the selo of Ulashanivka, transferred from Slavuta Raion;
- Yampil settlement hromada with the administration in the rural settlement of Yampil, transferred from Bilohiria Raion.

=== Before 2020 ===
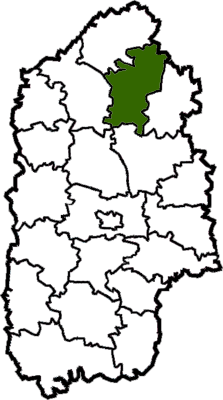
Shepetivka Raion in Khmelnytskyi Oblast (1966–2020)

Before the 2020 reform, the raion consisted of four hromadas:

- Hrytsiv settlement hromada with the administration in Hrytsiv;
- Lenkivtsi rural hromada with the administration in Lenkivtsi;
- Mykhailiuchka rural hromada with the administration in Mykhailiuchka;
- Sudylkiv rural hromada with the administration in Sudylkiv.

== History ==
From 1923 to 1932, the district was part of the Shepetivka region, then from 1932 to 1937 it was part of the Vinnytsia region. Following that from 1937 to 1954 it was part of the Kamenets Podolsk region. Since 1954 it has been part of the Khmelnytskyi Oblast.
