= Slavuta =

City in Khmelnytskyi Oblast, Ukraine

Slavuta Славута
- City
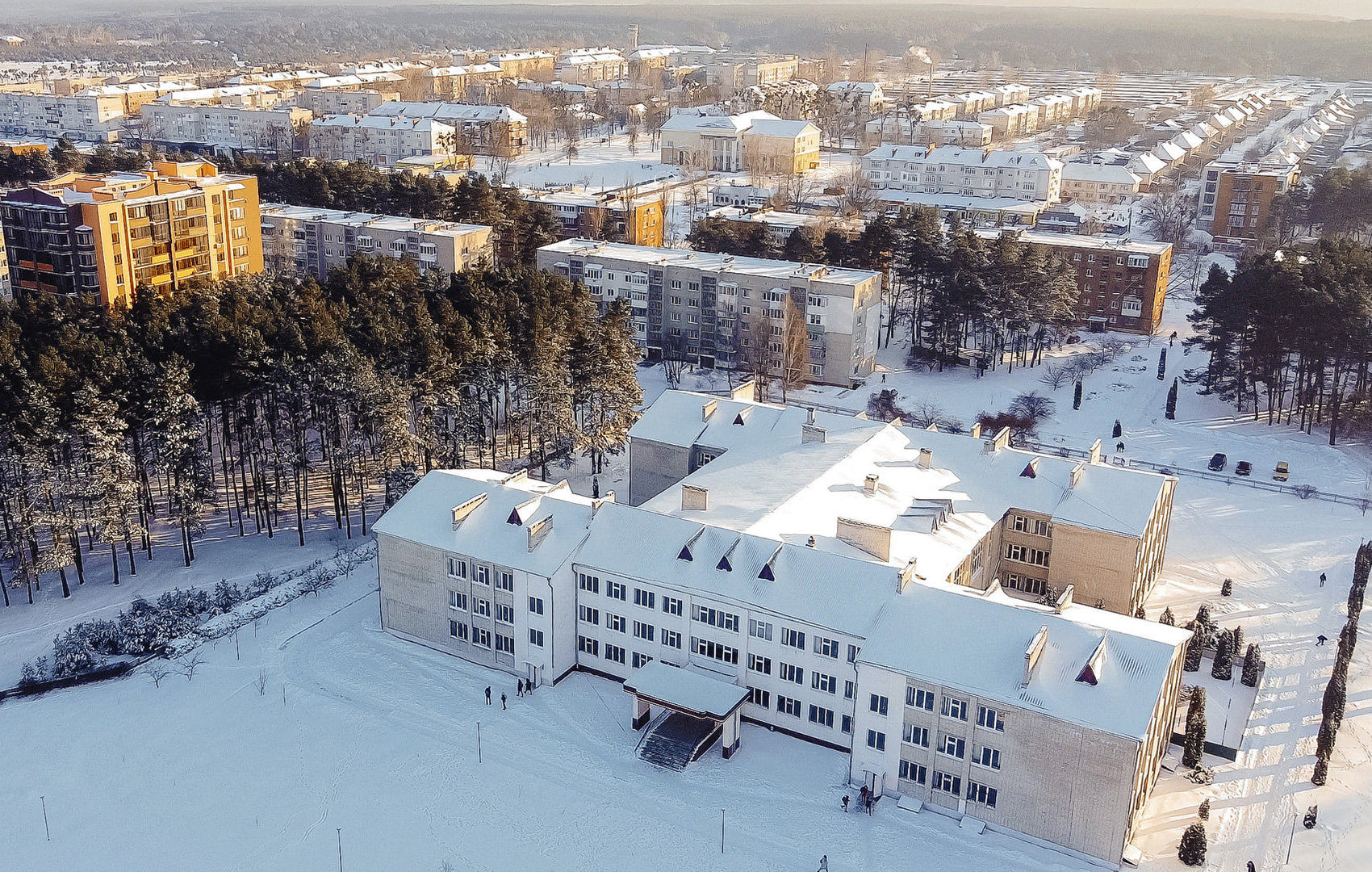
- View of Slavuta

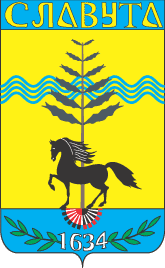
- Flag Coat of arms

- Location of Slavuta in Ukraine Slavuta (Ukraine)
- Coordinates: 50°18′10″N 26°52′06″E
- Country: Ukraine
- Oblast: Khmelnytskyi Oblast
- Raion: Shepetivka Raion
- Hromada: Slavuta urban hromada
- First mention date: XVII
- City rights: 1633

Government
  - Mayor: Vasyl B. Sydor

Area
  - Total: 20 km^{2} (7.7 sq mi)

Population (2022)
  - Total: 34,918
- Time zone: UTC+2 (EET)
  - Summer (DST): UTC+3 (EEST)
- Postal code: 30000
- Area code: +380 3842
- Website: www.slavuta-mvk.info

Slavuta (Ukrainian: Славута, IPA: [slɐˈwutɐ]; Polish: Sławuta; Yiddish: סלאוויטא, romanized: Slavita) is a city in Shepetivka Raion, Khmelnytskyi Oblast (province) of western Ukraine, located on the Horyn River. The city is located approximately 80 km from the oblast capital, Khmelnytskyi, at around 50°18′N 26°52′E. Slavuta hosts the administration of Slavuta urban hromada, one of the hromadas of Ukraine. Population: 34,301 (2023 estimate); 34,918 (2022 estimate).

== History ==
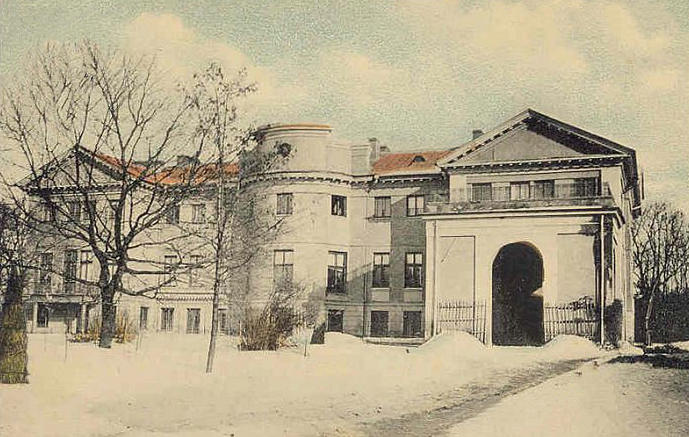
Sanguszko Palace in the early 20th century

Located in Volhynia, Slavuta was founded by a member of Zaslawski family in 1633. As the family extinguished, all its possessions were transferred to Lubomirski family. Eventually the town was passed on to Marianna Lubomirska who married Paweł Sanguszko who turned the town into the family seat of the Sanguszko princes. Administratively it was located in the Volhynian Voivodeship in the Lesser Poland Province of the Kingdom of Poland.

It was annexed by Russia in the Partitions of Poland. Between 1922 and 1939 it was on the Soviet border with Poland.

During World War II, the town was occupied by Germany from 1941 to 1944. The occupiers operated three prisoner-of-war camps in Slavuta, first Stalag 301 from August to November 1942, following its relocation from Kowel and before its further relocation to Shepetivka, then Stalag 357 from March to December 1943, following its relocation from Poltava and before its further relocation to Toruń in German-occupied Poland, and then Dulag 124 in early 1944, following its relocation from Poltava and before its further relocation to Hoyerswerda in Germany.

Until 18 July 2020, Slavuta was incorporated as a city of oblast significance and served as the administrative center of Slavuta Raion though it did not belong to the raion. In July 2020, as part of the administrative reform of Ukraine, which reduced the number of raions of Khmelnytskyi Oblast to three, the city of Slavuta was merged into Shepetivka Raion.

=== Jewish history ===
Slavuta has a rich Jewish history. The town had a prominent Jewish community since near its establishment in the 1600s. Town records show 246 Jewish families in 1765.

In 1791 the Shapira family set up a Hebrew printing press in Slavuta, which published an influential edition of the Talmud. Moshe Feldenkrais was born in Slavuta on 6 May 1904.

The peak of the Jewish population of Slavuta is over 5,100 in 1939, about 1/3 of the town's population. In the late 1890s the Jewish population of Slavuta was near 60% at 4,900 people.

The Jewish community consisted of farmers, traders, storekeepers, and rabbinical teachers. Slavuta at one point had nearly 200 Jewish owned shops, largely due to Slavuta being established as a prominent trading town and Jewish center. Slavuta also had three established synagogues.

==== Slavita Shas ====
A complete Talmud, known as The Slavita Shas was published in 1817 by Rabbi Moshe Shapira, "Av Bais Din and printer of Slavita." The Shapira Press was given a 25-year license to be the sole publishers of the Talmud in their region by a Jewish court.

==== World War II and beyond ====
With WWII and the invasion of Nazi Germany, the Jews of Slavuta had a fate similar as the Jews of hundreds of other villages near and far. Many hundreds were able to flee to Tashkent and Siberia. But over 2000 Jews were killed in the Slavuta ghetto and Nazi concentration camps. All but one synagogue remained, and the mass grave of Jews killed was left in a field.

After WWII, the town still had a sizable Jewish community. The survivors of the ghetto and concentration camp, the Jews who fled to Siberia and Tashkent, as well as surviving Jews from surrounding villages that had been completely destroyed, came back and resettled. Synagogue papers, furniture, and scripts from the surrounding ravaged communities had been brought to the Slavuta synagogue. Slavuta also had many monuments established, dedicated to the Jews killed during WWII. Today, the Jewish population is nearly 700.

== Famous residents ==
- Henryk Rzewuski, Polish Romantic-era journalist and novelist.
- Evsei Liberman, Soviet economist.
- Moshé Feldenkrais, physicist and the founder of the Feldenkrais Method, designed to improve human functioning by increasing self-awareness through movement.
- Julian Pęski, ethnic Polish Russian Empire surgeon.
- Jadwiga Sarnecka, Polish composer.
- Chava Shapiro, Hebrew writer and journalist.
- Oleksandr Zinchenko, Ukrainian politician who was Director-General of the National Space Agency of Ukraine from 2009 to 2010.
- Sanguszko family, a Polish-Lithuanian noble family of the Ruthenian origin from the Gediminid dynasty.
  - Eustachy Erazm Sanguszko, Polish general and politician.
  - Roman Sanguszko, Polish aristocrat, patriot, political and social activist.
  - Roman Damian Sanguszko, public and political leader, industrialist and landowner, collector.

== Gallery ==
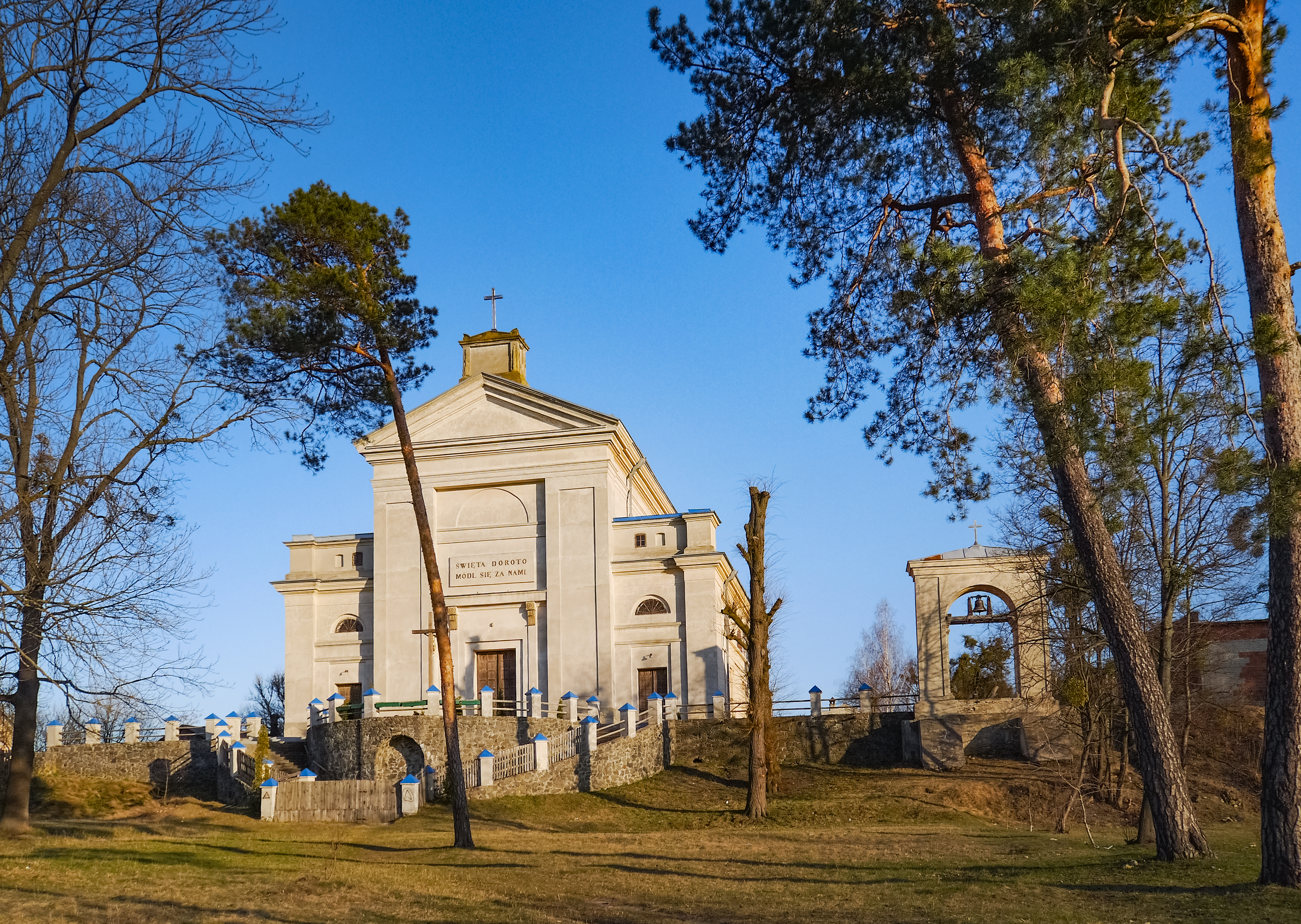
Polish Catholic Church of St. Dorothy

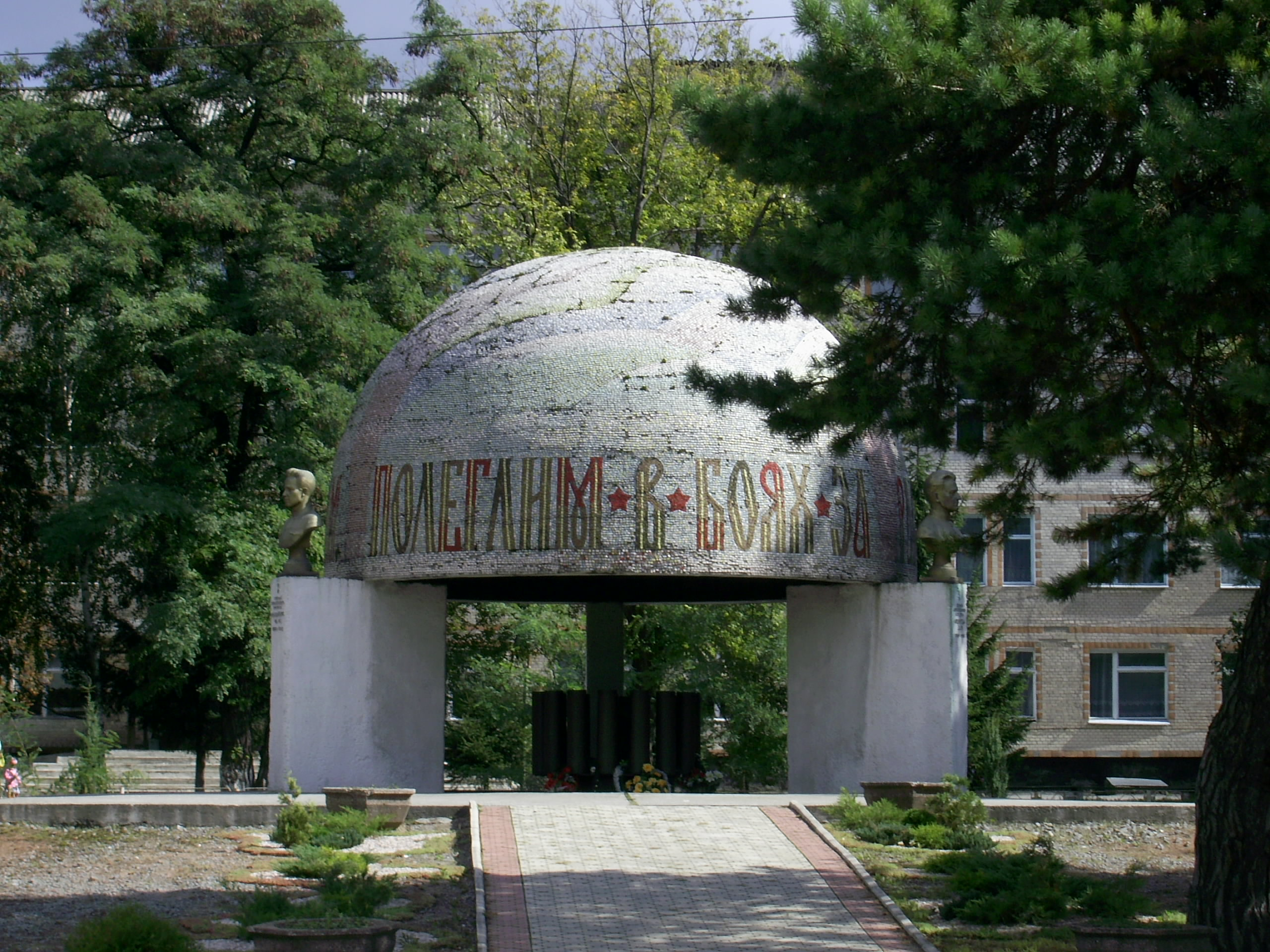
Grave of Soviet soldiers

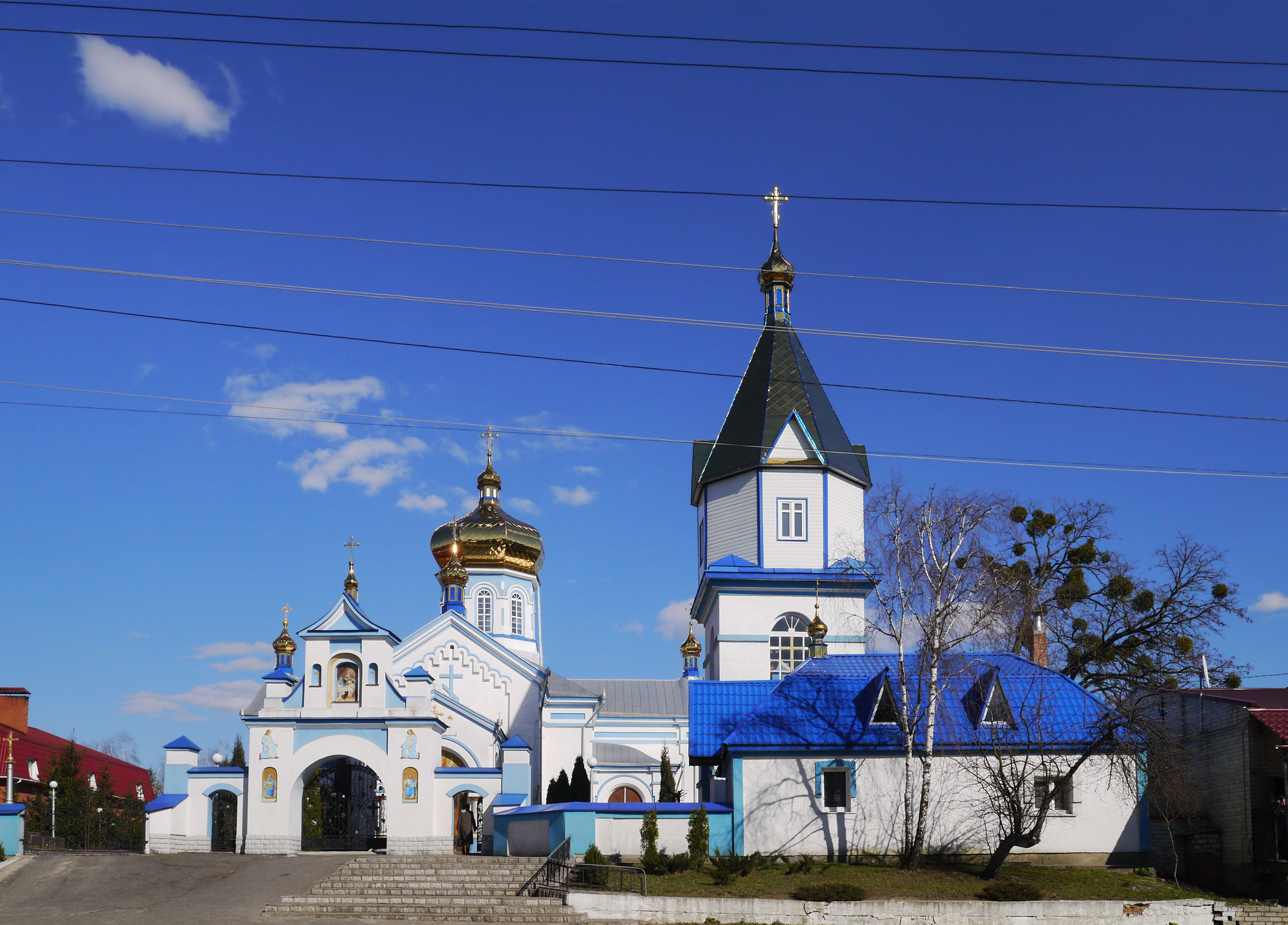
Church of Nativity of the Theotokos

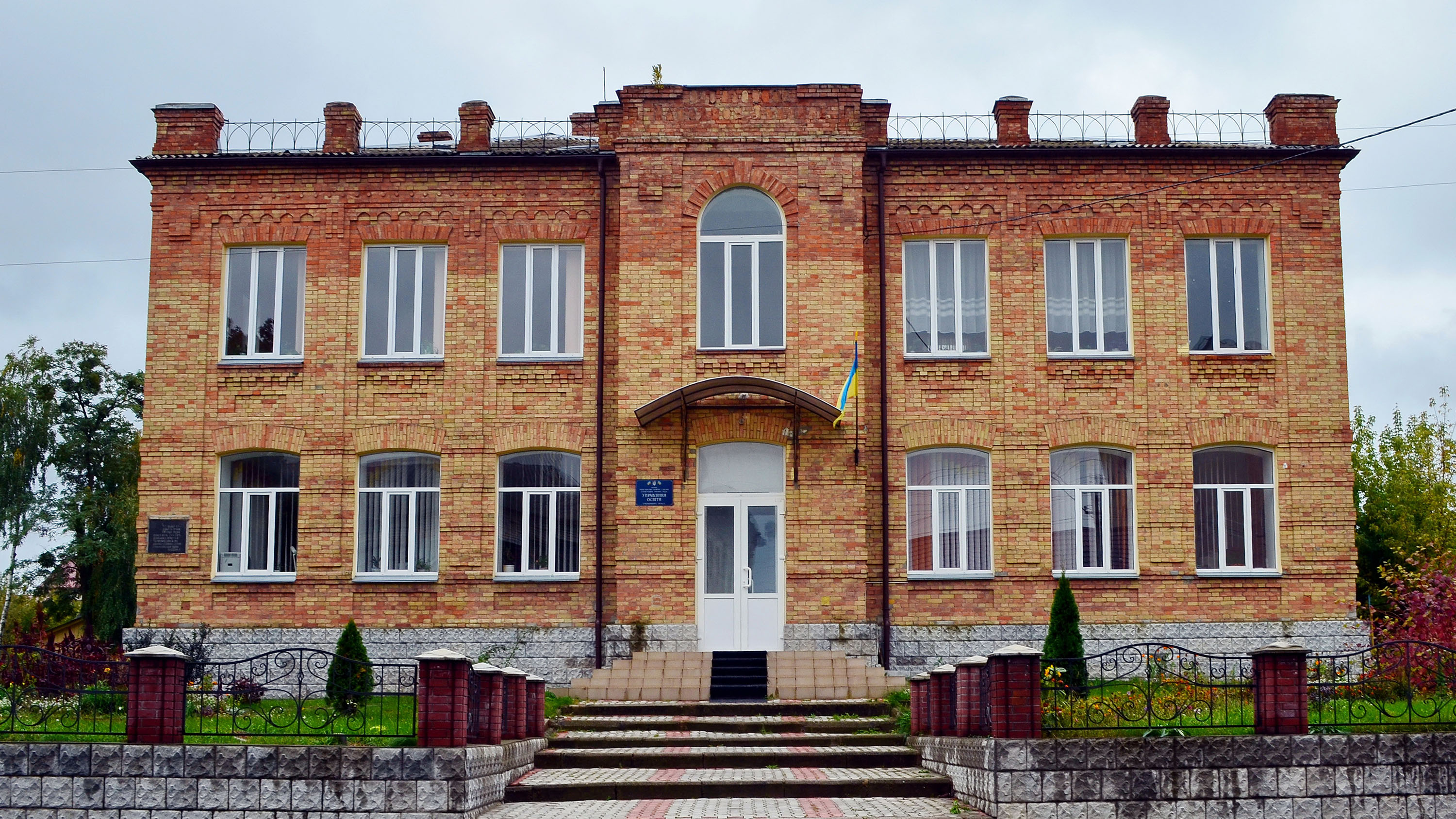
People's school

== See also ==
- Slăvuţa River
