= Khmelnytskyi Oblast =

Oblast (region) of Ukraine

Khmelnytskyi Oblast Хмельницька область
- Oblast
- Khmelnytska oblast
- Flag Coat of arms
- Nickname: Хмельниччина (Khmelnychchyna)
- Coordinates: 49.53°N 26.87°E
- Country: Ukraine
- Established: 22 September 1937
- Administrative center: Khmelnytskyi

Government
  - Governor: Serhii Tiurin
  - Oblast council: 84 seats
  - Chairperson: Violeta Labazyuk

Area
  - Total: 20,645 km^{2} (7,971 sq mi)
  - Rank: Ranked 19th

Population (2022)
  - Total: 1,228,829 ▼
  - Rank: Ranked 14th
  - Density: 59.522/km^{2} (154.16/sq mi)

GDP
  - Total: ₴ 120 billion (€3.1 billion)
  - Per capita: ₴ 96,964 (€2,500)
- Time zone: UTC+2 (EET)
  - Summer (DST): UTC+3 (EEST)
- Postal code: 29000-31999
- Area code: +380-38
- ISO 3166 code: UA-68
- Vehicle registration: вх, нх
- Raions: 3
- Cities: 13
- Settlements: 24
- Villages: 1416
- HDI (2022): 0.722 high
- FIPS 10-4: UP09
- NUTS statistical regions of Ukraine: UA53
- Website: adm-km.gov.ua

Khmelnytskyi Oblast (Ukrainian: Хмельницька область, romanized: Khmelnytska oblast), also known as Khmelnychchyna (Ukrainian: Хмельниччина), is an oblast (province) in western Ukraine covering portions of the historical regions of western Podolia and southern Volhynia. The administrative center of the oblast is the city of Khmelnytskyi. The current estimated population is around 1,228,829 (2022 estimate).

Created in 1937 out of border okrugs of Vinnytsia Oblast, in 1941–44 it was under Nazi Germany occupation and part of the Reichskommissariat Ukraine (Wolhynien und Podolien general district). Following the Kamenets-Podolsky pocket in spring of 1944 as part of the Proskurov-Chernovtsy operation, Soviet troops removed the German occupation in the region. Until 4 February 1954 it was called Kamianets-Podilskyi Oblast (Ukrainian: Кам'янець-Подільська область, romanized: Kamianets-Podilska oblast) and was centered in Kamianets-Podilsky until 1941. The region rebranding took place after the official renaming of the region's administrative center to Khmelnytskyi.

== Geography ==
Khmelnytskyi Oblast has a total area of 20,600 km^{2} (7,953.70 sq mi) (3.4% of the total area of Ukraine) and is located between 48°27' and 50°37' north latitude and between 26°09' and 27°56' east longitude. It is 220 km (136.70 mi) long when measured from north to south, and is 120 km (74.56 mi) in length when measured from east to west. It is associated with a historical region of Podolia, yet in reality its territory is split almost in half, the northern in Volhynia, and the southern in Podolia. Its Volhynian region contains smaller cities like Iziaslav, Starokostiantyniv, Shepetivka, while its Podolian portion more developed cities of Khmelnytskyi and Kamianets-Podilskyi.

The oblast borders the Rivne Oblast to the northwest, the Zhytomyr Oblast to the northeast, the Vinnytsia Oblast to the east, the Chernivtsi Oblast to the south, and the Ternopil Oblast to the west.

=== Elevations ===
The Podolian Upland (270–370 meters above sea-level) occupies the central area of the Khmelnytskyi Oblast. The northwestern areas of the oblast are part of the Volyn highland (highest point — 329 m above sea-level), while to the north, the oblast claims a part of the historic region of Polissia (highest point — 200–250 m above sea-level). The southwestern territory of the Khmelnytskyi Oblast is crossed by the Tovtry range (Ukrainian: Товтровий кряж, romanized: Tovtrovyi kriazh), which includes Mount Velyka Buhaikha (Ukrainian: Велика Бугаїха), the highest point of the oblast at 409 m above sea-level. The extreme south of the oblast has a surface with canyon-like river valleys. The Dniester Reservoir located there is the lowest point of the oblast (121 m above sea level).

=== Rivers and Lakes ===
There are 120 rivers with a length of 10 km (6.21 mi) or more in the Khmelnytskyi Oblast. The largest of these are the Dniester River (which flows for 160 km (99.42 mi) within the oblast), as well as its tributaries: Smotrych, Ushytsia, and the Zbruch — and the Southern Buh River (which flows for 120 km (74.56 mi) within the oblast), as well as its tributaries: Buzhok, Ikva, and Vovk. The rivers of the Dnieper River's basin — Horyn, Khmora, and Sluch Rivers also run through the oblast. The oblast's lakes are located mostly in basin of the Horyn River. The largest reservoir in the oblast is the Dniester Reservoir.

There are 1858 ponds and/or reservoirs in the oblast. The largest of these include Shchedrivske (with a surface area of 12.58 km^{2} (4.86 sq mi)), Novostavske (with a surface area of 11.68 km^{2} (4.51 sq mi)), and Kuzmynske (with a surface area of 7.65 km^{2} (2.95 sq mi)).

== History ==
Historic administrative affiliation of the area:

- 1937–1941: USSR, Ukrainian SSR
- 1944–1991: USSR, Ukrainian SSR
- since 1991: Ukraine: Khmelnytskyi Oblast

Khmelnytskyi Oblast was created on September 22, 1937, as the Kamianets-Podilskyi Oblast (Ukrainian: Кам'янець-Подільськa область, romanized: Kamianets-Podilska oblast) out of border okruhas (Proskuriv and Kamianets-Podilskyi) of the Vinnytsia Oblast.

In March 1941 the administrative center of the oblast was moved from Kamianets-Podilskyi to the city of Proskuriv. During the World War II the territory was part of another administrative division (General District Wolhynien und Podolien, see Reichskommissariat Ukraine), but after liberation from the Nazi Germany, Khmelnytskyi Oblast was reinstated in its original borders. In 1954, Proskuriv was renamed Khmelnytskyi (in honour of Bohdan Khmelnytskyi), and soon afterward, the oblast was renamed to Khmelnytskyi Oblast (Ukrainian: Хмельницька область, romanized: Khmelnytska oblast).

== Administrative divisions ==
The oblast is subdivided into 3 raions (administrative districts). It consists of 13 cities, 24 towns, and more than 1,417 villages.

The following data incorporates the number of each type of administrative divisions of Khmelnytskyi Oblast:

- Administrative Center – 1 (Khmelnytskyi);
- Raions — 3;
- Hromadas — 60.

The local administration of the oblast is controlled by the Khmelnytskyi Regional Council. The governor of the oblast is the Khmelnytskyi Regional Council speaker, appointed by the President of Ukraine.

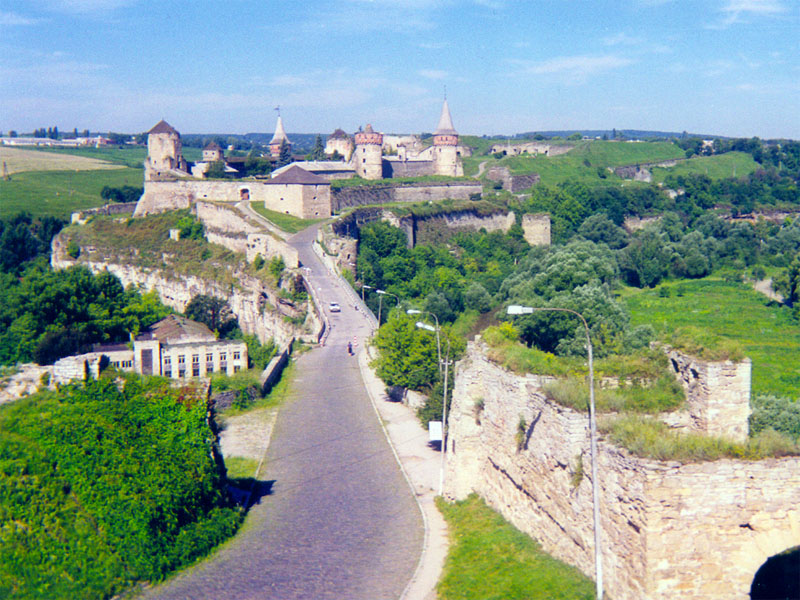
The Kamianets-Podilskyi Castle. The bastion on the right was guarding the bridgehead leading to the fortress. In the far right the "New Castle" is visible.

== Demographics ==
According to the 2001 Ukrainian census, ethnic Ukrainians accounted for 93.9% of the population of Khmelnytskyi Oblast, ethnic Russians for 3.6%, and ethnic Poles for 1.6%.

Khmelnytskyi Oblast's population is 1,401,140 as of January 1, 2004. As of 2002, the oblast ranks 13th by population in Ukraine. The population density is 69.5/km^{2}.

Pensioners make up 453,800 thousand people or 31,7% of population. The birth rate per 1,000 residents is 8.3, and the death rate — per 1000 residents – 16.1. The urban population, according to the 2001 Ukrainian Census data, accounted for 729,600 people, or 51%, and the rural population — for 701,200 people, or 49%.

According to the data, the number of men accounted for 659,900 people, or 46.1%, that of women — 770,900 people, or 53.9%.

=== Language ===
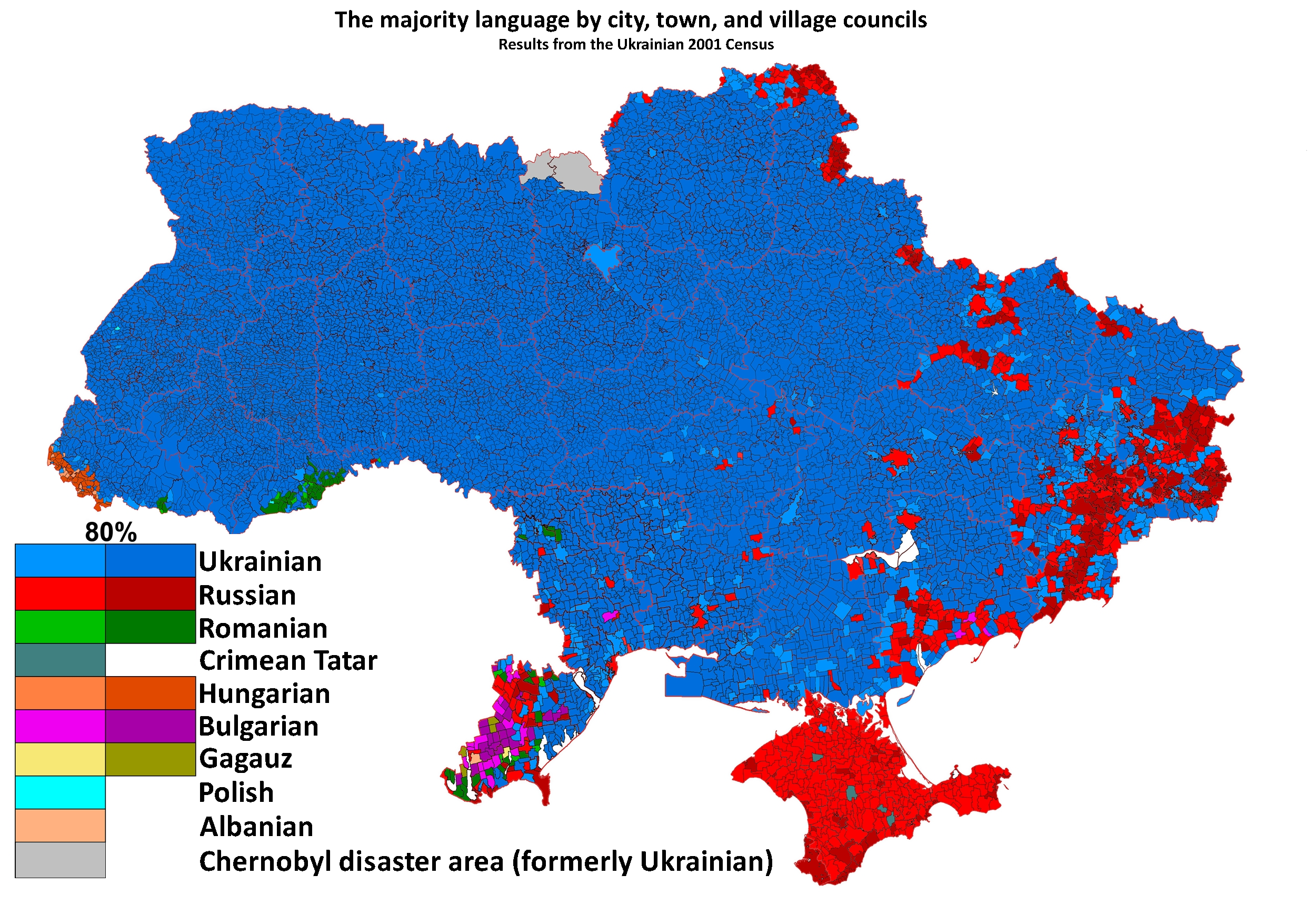
According to the 2001 Ukrainian census, Ukrainian was the native language for over 95% of Khmelnytskyi Oblast's population: it was the dominant language in all of the city, town, and village councils of the oblast.

Due to the Russification of Ukraine during the Soviet era, the share of Ukrainian speakers in the population of Khmelnytskyi Oblast gradually decreased between the 1970 and 1989 censuses, while the share of Russian speakers increased. Native language of the population of Khmelnytskyi Oblast according to the results of population censuses:

	1959	1970	1979	1989	2001
Ukrainian	89.4%	93.1%	92.3%	91.3%	95.2%
Russian	5.7%	5.8%	6.9%	8.0%	4.1%
Other	4.9%	1.1%	0.8%	0.7%	0.7%

Native language of the population of the raions and cities of Khmelnytskyi Oblast according to the 2001 Ukrainian census:

	Ukrainian	Russian
Khmelnytskyi Oblast	95.2%	4.1%
City of Khmelnytskyi	88.4%	10.4%
City of Kamianets-Podilskyi	91.2%	7.1%
City of Netishyn	87.7%	11.4%
City of Slavuta	92.3%	7.2%
City of Shepetivka	93.5%	5.7%
City of Starokostiantyniv	92.0%	7.5%
Bilohiria Raion	99.0%	0.8%
Vinkivtsi Raion	97.2%	2.6%
Volochysk Raion	98.5%	1.3%
Horodok Raion	98.5%	1.0%
Derazhnia Raion	98.2%	1.4%
Dunaivtsi Raion	98.4%	1.3%
Iziaslav Raion	97.0%	2.8%
Kamianets-Podilskyi Raion (in pre-2020 borders)	98.6%	1.2%
Krasyliv Raion	98.4%	1.4%
Letychiv Raion	98.2%	1.5%
Nova Ushytsia Raion	96.5%	3.3%
Polonne Raion	98.4%	1.4%
Slavuta Raion	98.8%	1.1%
Starokostiantyniv Raion	98.6%	1.1%
Stara Syniava Raion	98.7%	0.8%
Teofipol Raion	98.9%	0.8%
Khmelnytskyi Raion (in pre-2020 borders)	95.8%	2.0%
Chemerivtsi Raion	99.1%	0.8%
Shepetivka Raion (in pre-2020 borders)	97.9%	1.7%
Yarmolyntsi Raion	98.1%	1.5%

Ukrainian is the only official language on the whole territory of Khmelnytskyi Oblast.

According to a poll conducted by Rating from 16 November to 10 December 2018 as part of the project «Portraits of Regions», 85% of the residents of Khmelnytskyi Oblast believed that the Ukrainian language should be the only state language on the entire territory of Ukraine. 8% believed that Ukrainian should be the only state language, while Russian should be the second official language in some regions of the country. 3% believed that Russian should become the second state language of the country. 4% found it difficult to answer.

On 15 June 2022, a moratorium on the public use of Russian-language cultural products was imposed in Khmelnytskyi Oblast by a decision of the Khmelnytskyi Oblast Council.

In 2023, Khmelnytskyi Oblast Military Administration approved the «Programme of development and functioning of the Ukrainian language as the state language in all spheres of public life in Khmelnytskyi Oblast for 2023—2025», the main purpose of which is to strengthen the position of the Ukrainian language in various spheres of public life in the oblast.

According to the research of the Content Analysis Centre, conducted from 15 August to 15 September 2024, the topic of which was the ratio of Ukrainian and Russian languages in the Ukrainian segment of social media, 88.8% of posts from Khmelnytskyi Oblast were written in Ukrainian (86.0% in 2023, 77.9% in 2022, 41.8% in 2020), while 11.2% were written in Russian (14.0% in 2023, 22.1% in 2022, 58.2% in 2020).

After Ukraine declared independence in 1991, Khmelnytskyi Oblast, as well as Ukraine as a whole, experienced a gradual Ukrainization of the education system, which had been Russified during the Soviet era. Dynamics of the ratio of the languages of instruction in general secondary education institutions in Khmelnytskyi Oblast:

Language of instruction, % of pupils	1991— 1992	1992— 1993	1993— 1994	1994— 1995	1995— 1996	2000— 2001	2005— 2006	2007— 2008	2010— 2011	2012— 2013	2015— 2016	2018— 2019	2021— 2022	2022— 2023
Ukrainian	81.5%	84.1%	87.3%	89.7%	92.0%	98.0%	99.3%	99.5%	99.5%	99.5%	99.5%	99.7%	99.90%	99.74%
Russian	18.5%	15.9%	12.7%	10.3%	8.0%	2.0%	0.4%	0.3%	0.2%	0.2%	0.2%	0.1%	—	—

According to the State Statistics Service of Ukraine, in the 2023–2024 school year, of the 135,705 pupils in general secondary education institutions in Khmelnytskyi Oblast, 135,475 (99.83%) were studying in classes where Ukrainian was the language of instruction, while 230 (0.17%) were studying in classes where Polish was the language of instruction.

=== Age structure ===
0-14 years: 15.1% ▲ (male 101,597/female 95,783)
15-64 years: 68.5% ▼ (male 435,464/female 463,058)
65 years and over: 16.4% ▼ (male 69,479/female 145,420) (2013 official)

=== Median age ===
total: 40.4 years ▲
male: 37.1 years ▲
female: 43.6 years (2013 official)

== Economy ==
The economy of the oblast mostly deals with the energy industry, transport and agriculture. The oblast is situated at a historical crossroad of the railway and highway routes connecting Central Europe to Black Sea coast and Russia (with the city of Shepetivka being the most important railway junction). The Khmelnyts’ka nuclear power plant in the city of Netishyn is the most important industrial company of the oblast. Notable machinery, armament and chemical industries are also present.

== Attractions ==
- Kamianets National Historical-Architectural Reserve (including the Old Town and the Castle)
- Medzhybizh National Historical-Cultural Reserve (including the Fortress)
- Samchyky National Historical-Cultural Reserve

== Nomenclature ==
Most of Ukraine's oblasts are named after their administrative center cities, officially referred to as "oblast centers" (Ukrainian: обласний центр, translit. oblasnyi tsentr). The name of each oblast is a relative adjective, formed by adding a feminine suffix to the name of respective center city: Khmelnytskyi is the center of the Khmelnyts’ka oblast’.

== Notable people ==
- Vasyl Sviato (1948–2025), member of the Verkhovna Rada

== Gallery ==
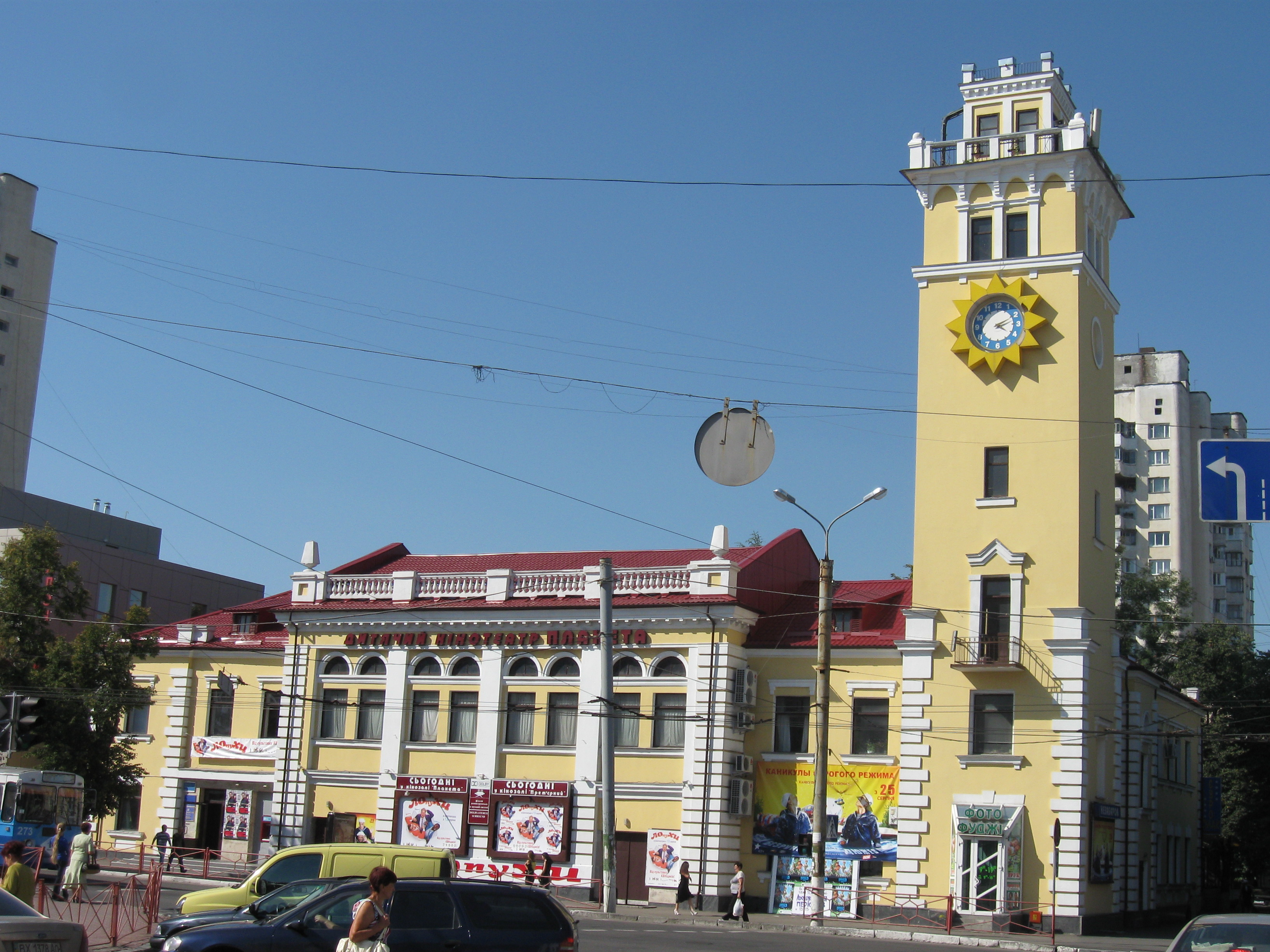
Proskuriv kalancha

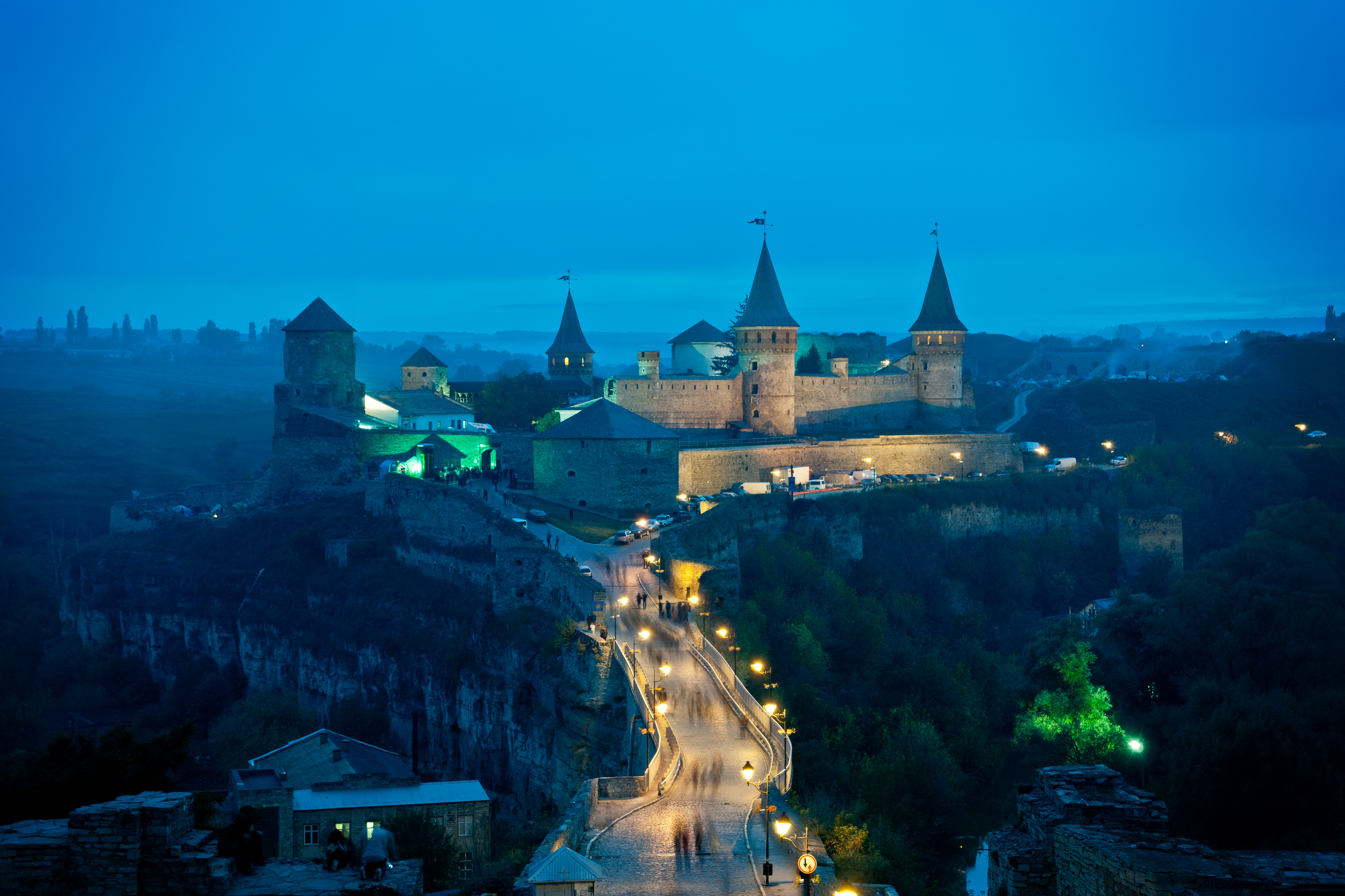
Kamianets-Podilskyi Castle

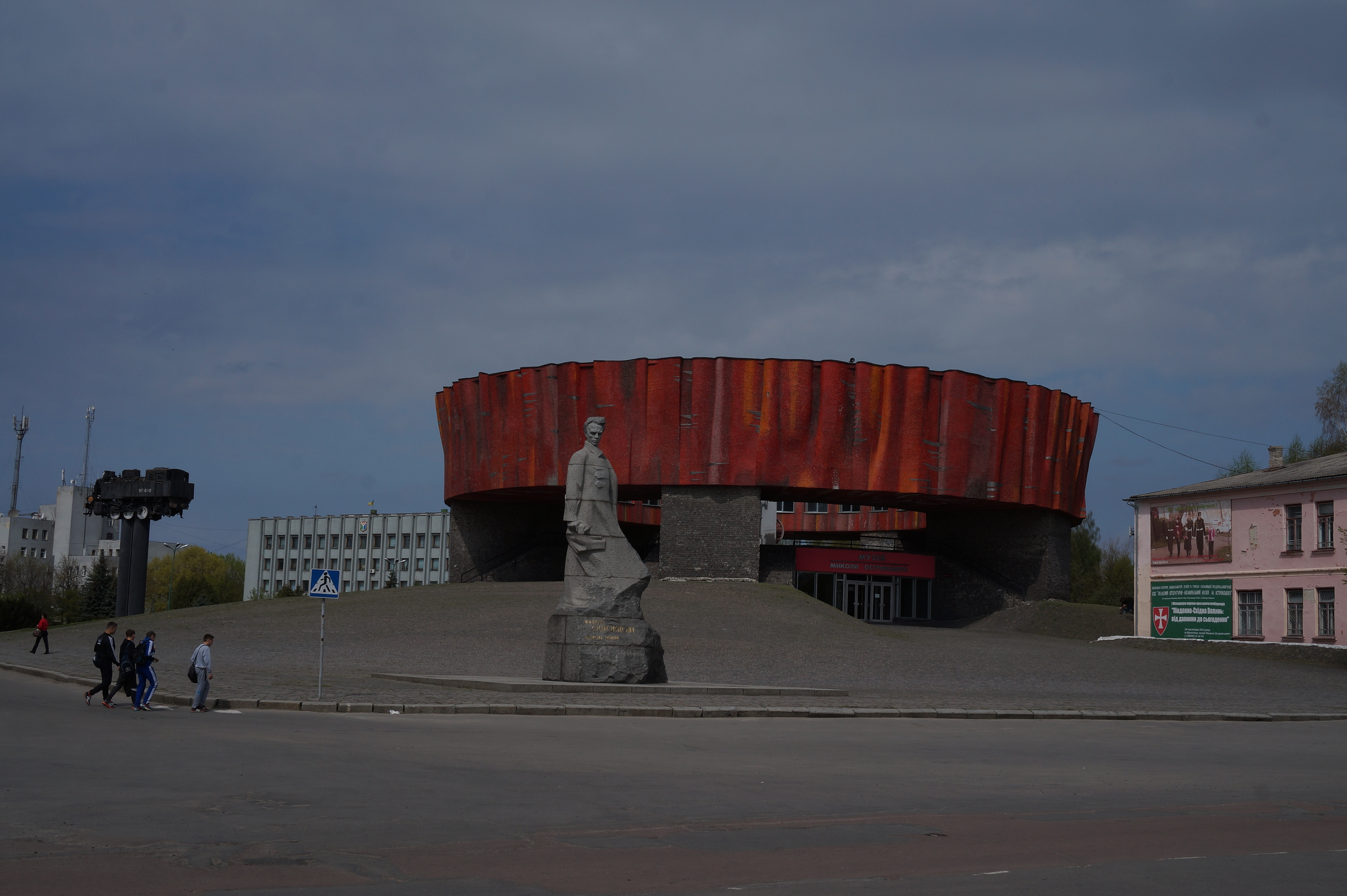
Shepetivka

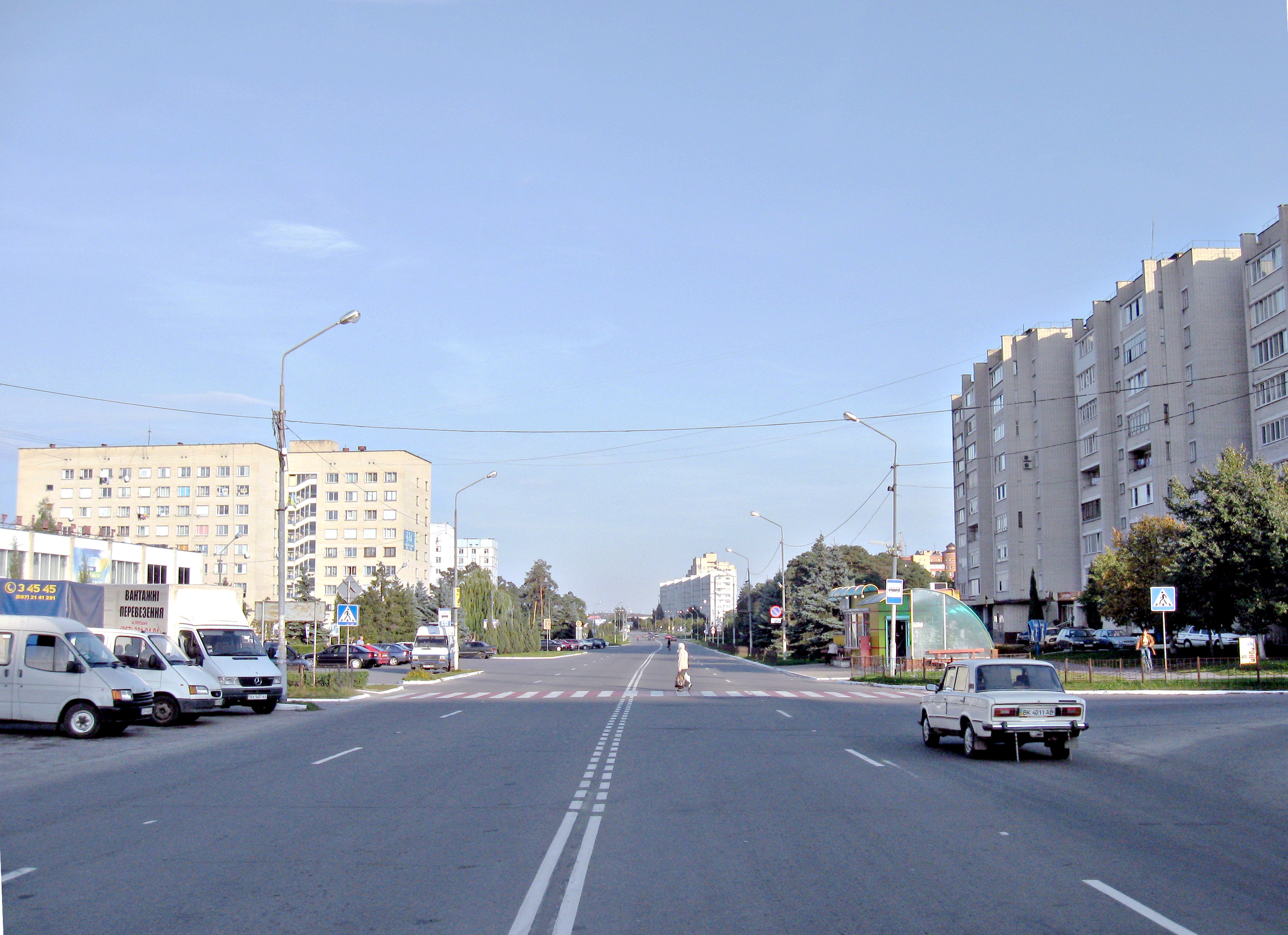
Independence Avenue in Netishyn

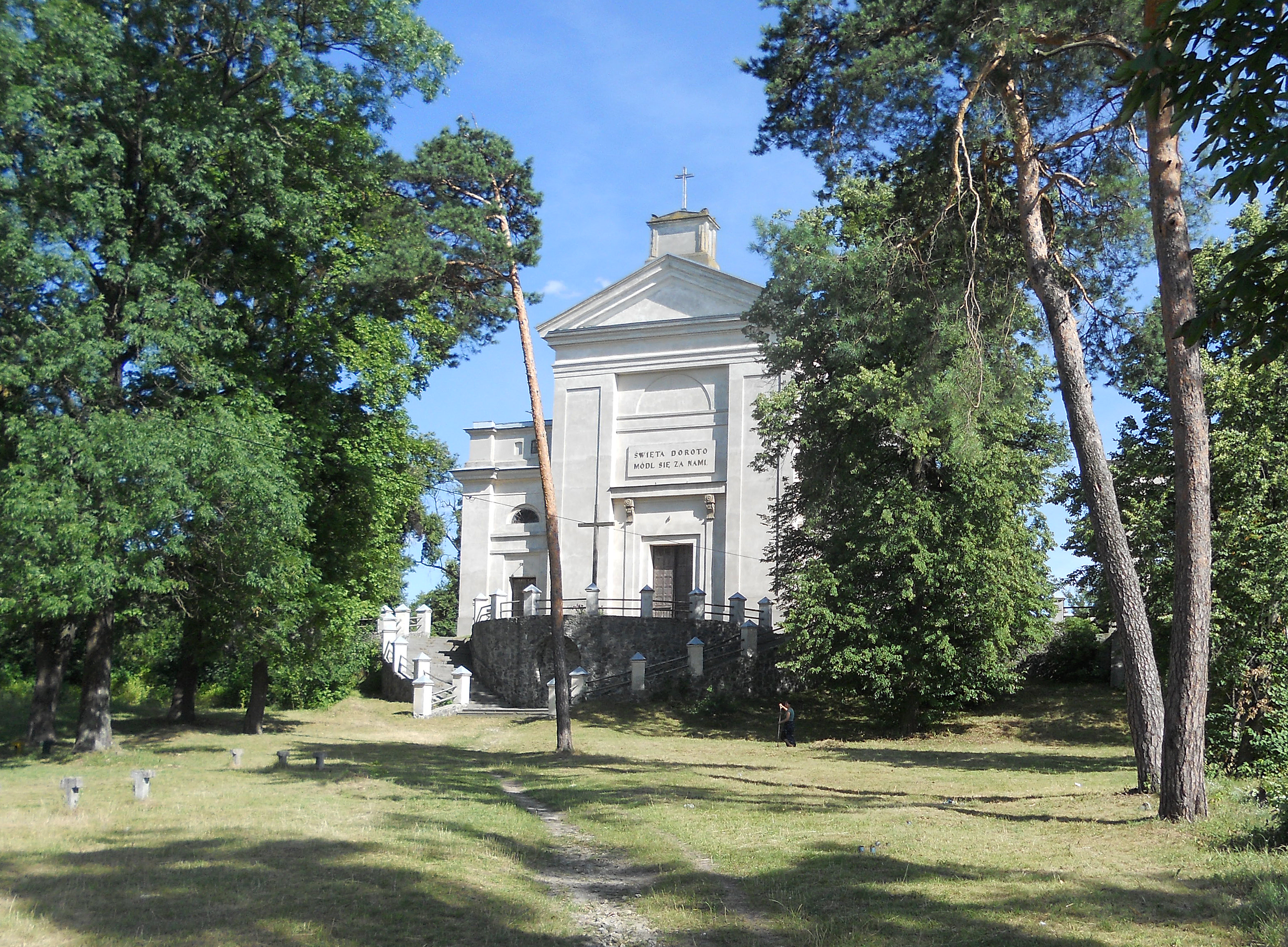
Church of Saint Dorothy in Slavuta

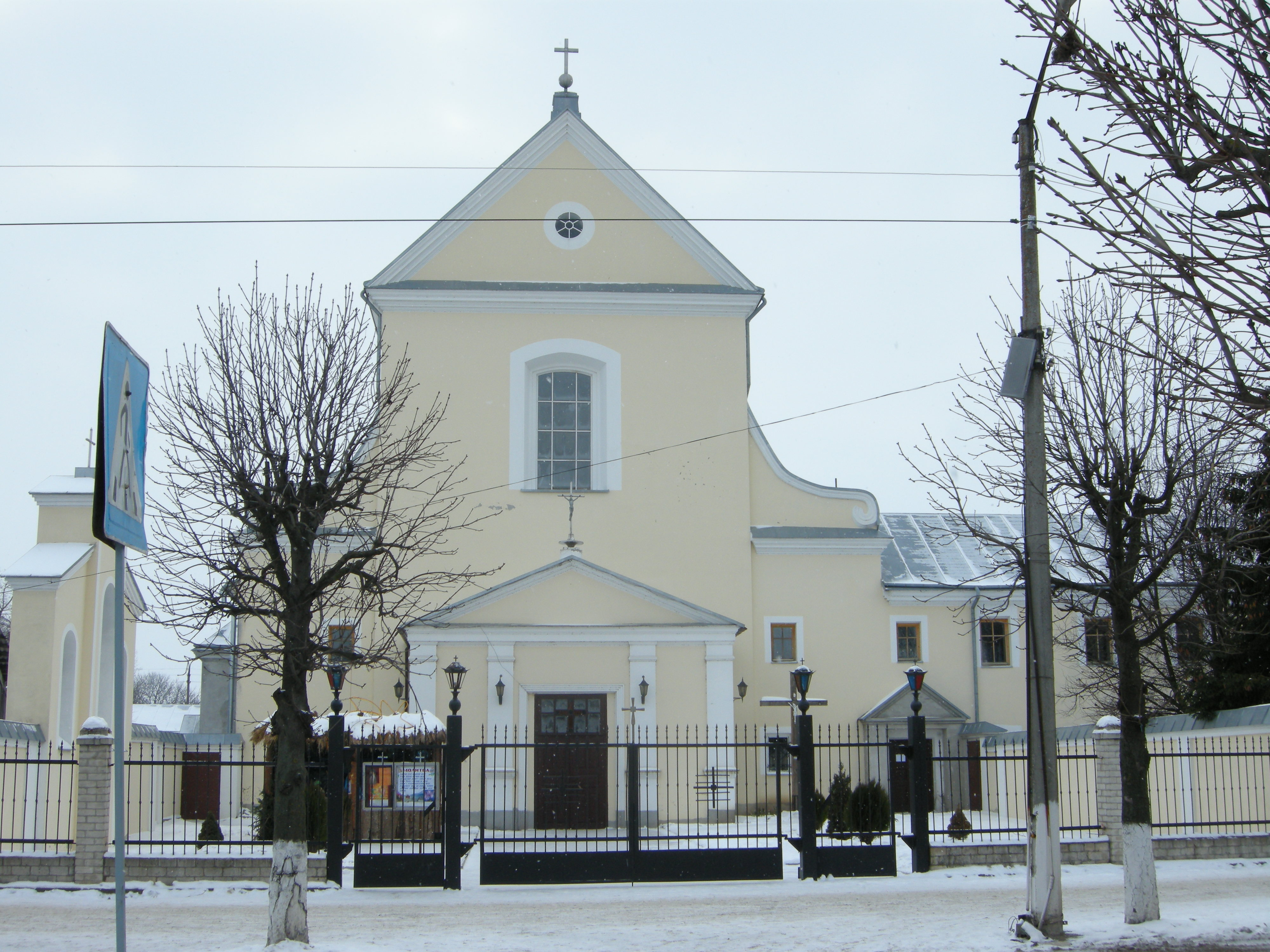
John the Baptist Church in Starokostiantyniv

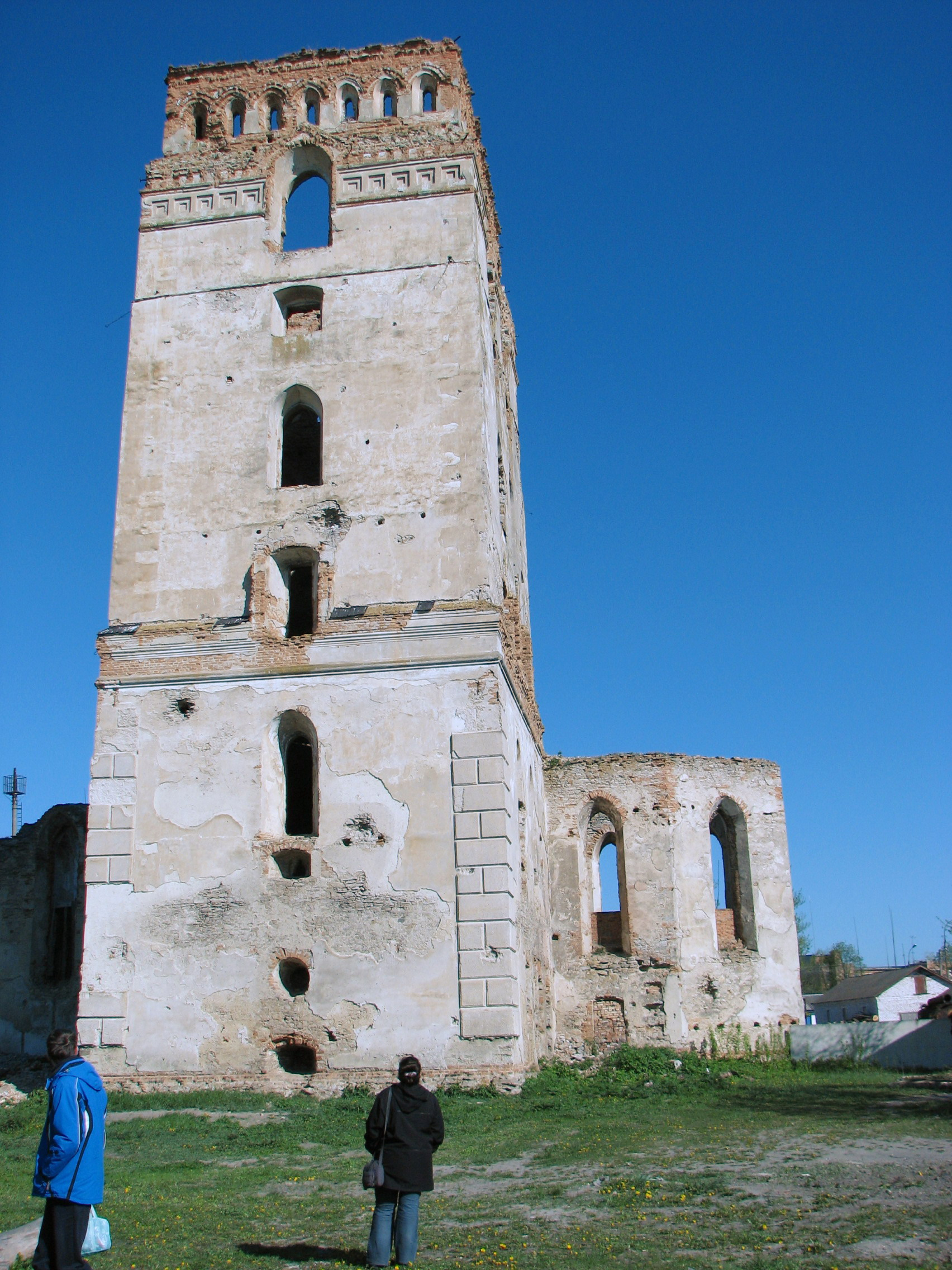
Defense tower in Starokostiantyniv

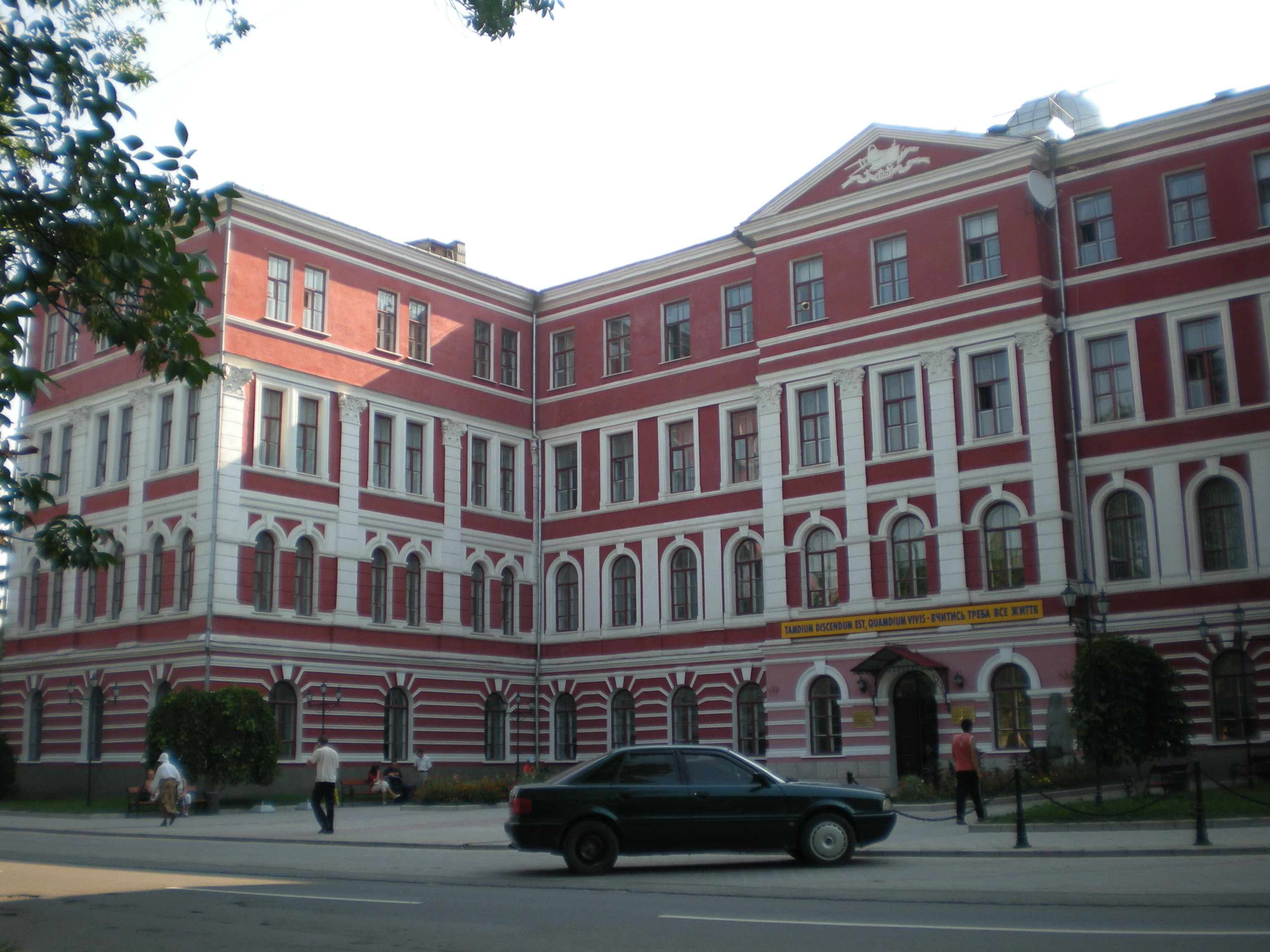
National University named after I. Ohiienko

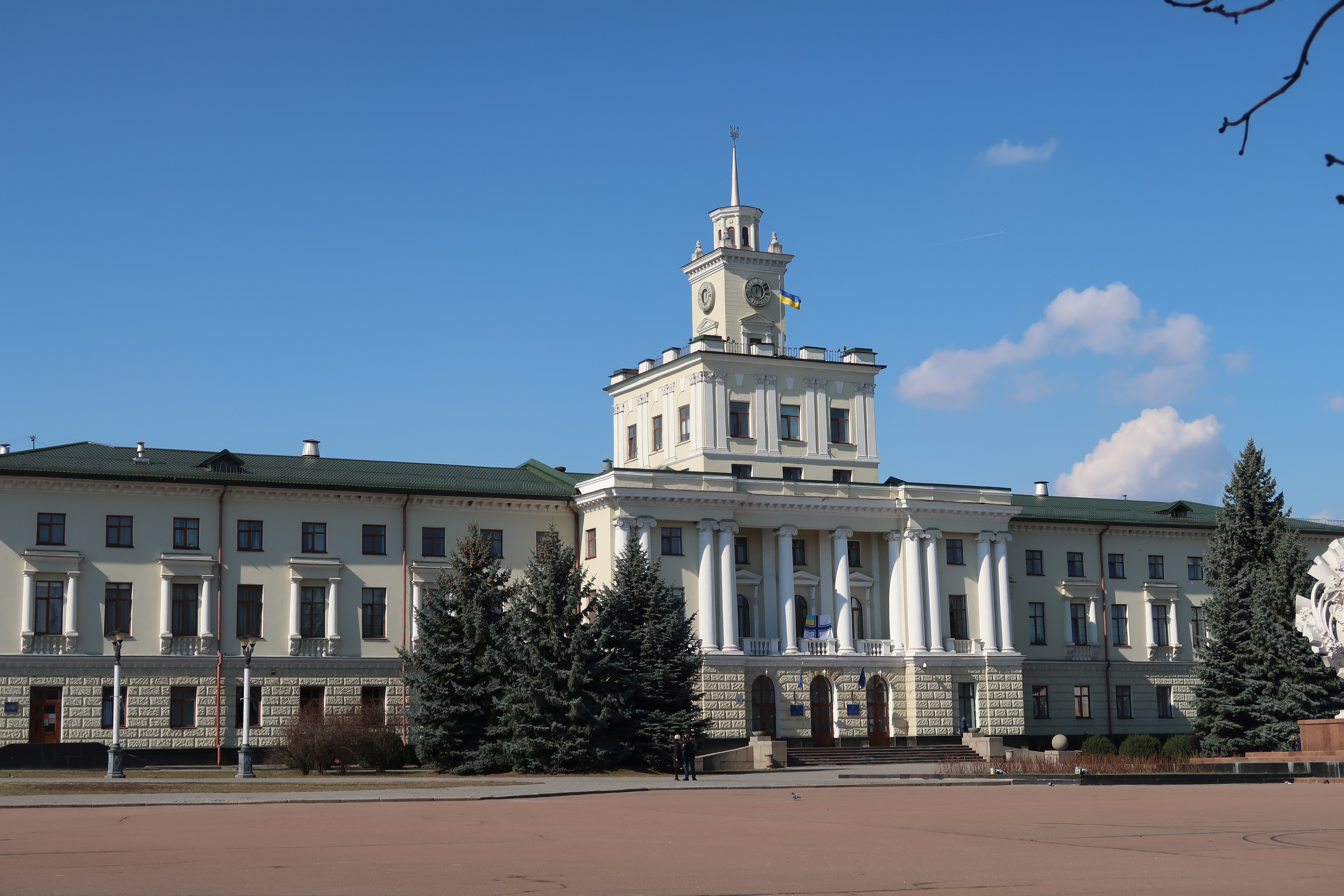
Khmelnytskyi Oblast administration building

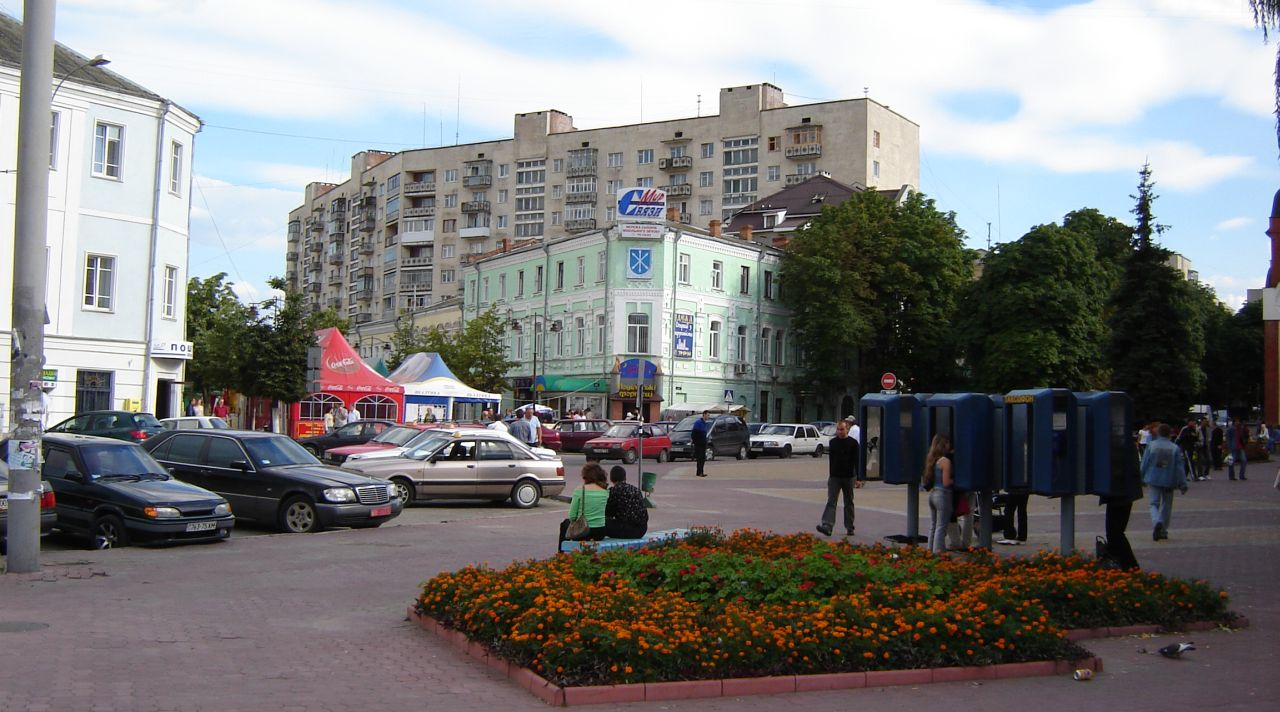
Proskurivska street in Khmelnytskyi

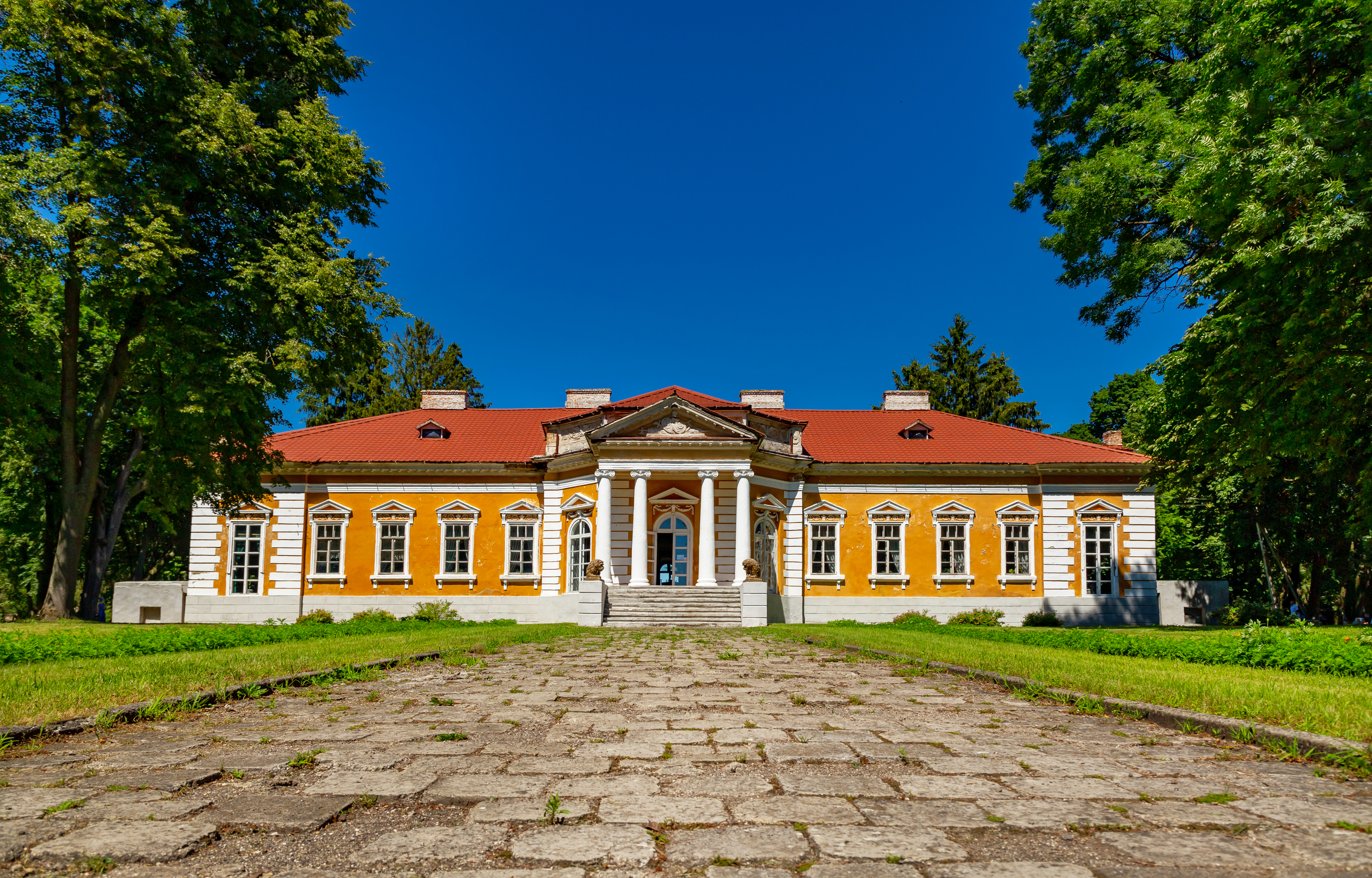
Chechels' Palace, a part of the Samchyky Estate

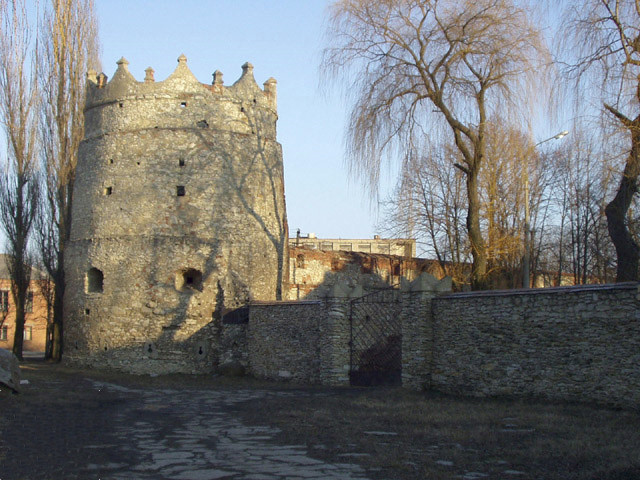
Medieval fortress in Letychiv

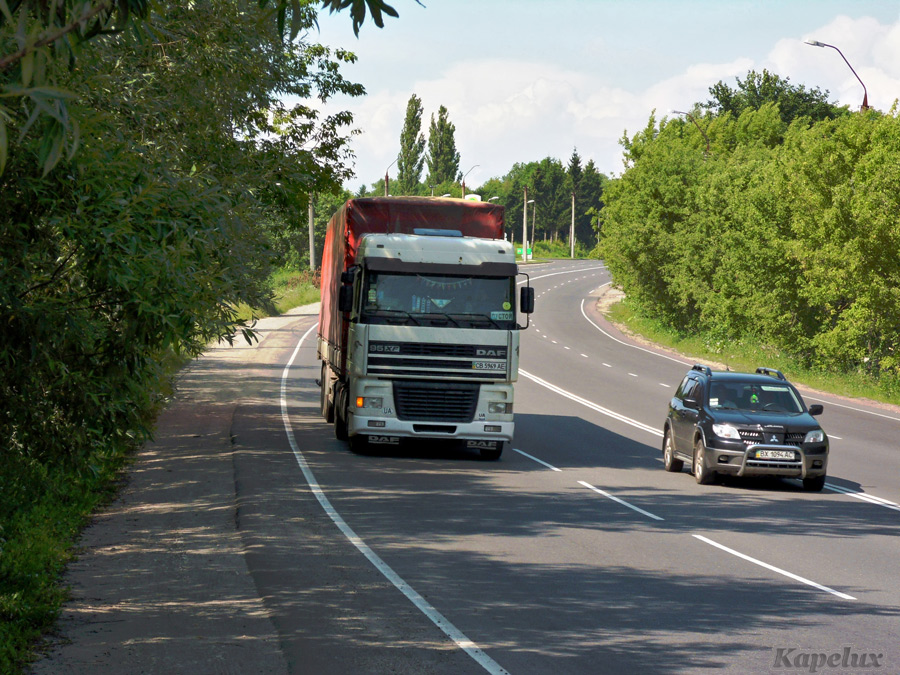
Highway H03

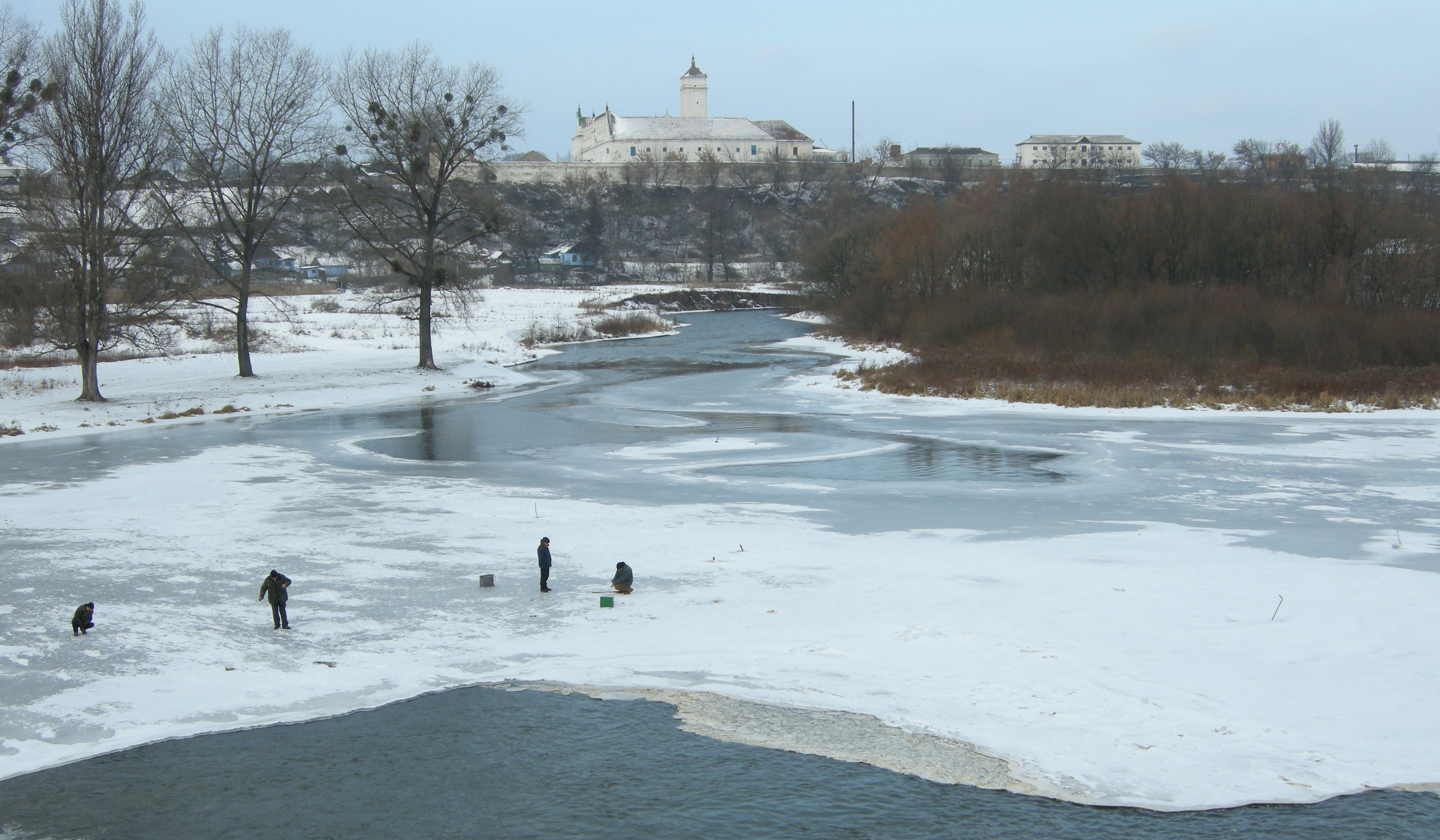
Horyn River in Iziaslav

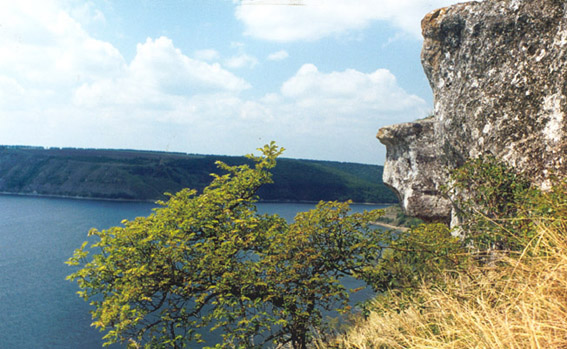
Dniester panorama

== See also ==
- Romanization of Ukrainian
- List of villages in Khmelnytskyi Oblast
- Subdivisions of Ukraine
- Volhynia
- Podolia
