= Krasyliv Raion =

Former subdivision of Khmelnytskyi Oblast, Ukraine

Krasyliv Raion Красилівський район
- Raion
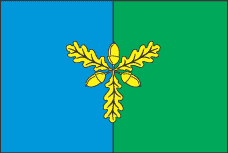
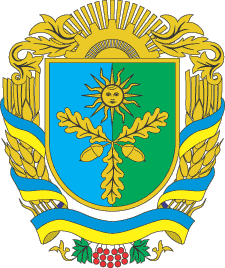
- Flag Coat of arms

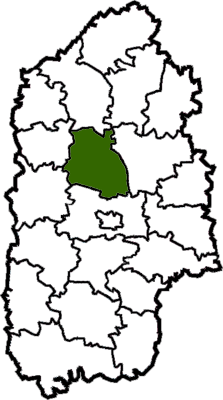
- Coordinates: 49°43′34″N 26°52′18″E
- Country: Ukraine
- Region: Khmelnytskyi Oblast
- Established: 7 March 1923
- Disestablished: 18 July 2020
- Admin. center: Krasyliv
- Subdivisions: List: 1 — city councils; 1 — settlement councils; 35 — rural councils; Number of localities: 1 — cities; 1 — urban-type settlements; 93 — villages; 0 — rural settlements

Government
  - Governor: Petro Arseniuk (PR)

Area
  - Total: 1,180 km^{2} (460 sq mi)

Population (2020)
  - Total: 49,345 ▼
  - Density: 41.8/km^{2} (108/sq mi)
- Time zone: UTC+02:00 (EET)
  - Summer (DST): UTC+03:00 (EEST)
- Postal index: 31000—31075
- Area code: +380 3855
- Website: www.krasilov-rda.km.ua

Krasyliv Raion (Ukrainian: Красилівський район, Krasylivs'kyi raion) was one of the 20 administrative raions (a district) of Khmelnytskyi Oblast in western Ukraine. The raion's administrative center was located in the city of Krasyliv. Its population was 61,331 in the 2001 Ukrainian Census. The raion was abolished on 18 July 2020 as part of the administrative reform of Ukraine, which reduced the number of raions of Khmelnytskyi Oblast to three. The area of Krasyliv Raion was merged into Khmelnytskyi Raion. The last estimate of the raion population was 49,345 (2020 est.)

== Geography ==
Krasyliv Raion was located in the central part of the Khmelnytskyi Oblast, corresponding to the modern-day boundaries of the Volhynia and Podolia historical regions. One of the main rivers that ran through the raion was the Sluch River, a tributary of the Pripyat. The raion could be accessed nationally via the H 03 national highway and the Southwestern Railways.

== History ==
Krasyliv Raion was first established on March 7, 1923 as a raion of the Shepetivka Okruha during a full-scale administrative reorganization of the Ukrainian Soviet Socialist Republic. From February 3, 1931 to February 26, 1935, Krasyliv Raion did not exist and its territory was instead part of Antoniny Raion, although it was again re-established on February 26, 1935.

== Subdivisions ==
At the time of disestablishment, the raion consisted of four hromadas:

- Antoniny settlement hromada with the administration in the urban-type settlement of Antoniny;
- Krasyliv urban hromada with the administration in the city of Krasyliv;
- Shchyborivka rural hromada with the administration in the selo of Shchyborivka;
- Zasluchne rural hromada with the administration in the selo of Zasluchne.

Krasyliv Raion was divided in a way that followed the general administrative scheme in Ukraine. Local government was also organized along a similar scheme nationwide. Consequently, raions were subdivided into councils, which were the prime level of administrative division in the country.

Each of the raion's urban localities administered their own councils, often containing a few other villages within its jurisdiction. However, only a handful of rural localities were organized into councils, which also might contain a few villages within its jurisdiction.

Accordingly, the Krasyliv Raion was divided into:

- 1 city council—made of the city of Krasyliv (administrative center);
- 1 settlement council—made up of the urban-type settlement of Antoniny
- 35 village councils

Overall, the raion had a total of 95 populated localities, consisting of one city, one urban-type settlement, and 93 villages.
