= Gaetano Moroni =

Italian writer

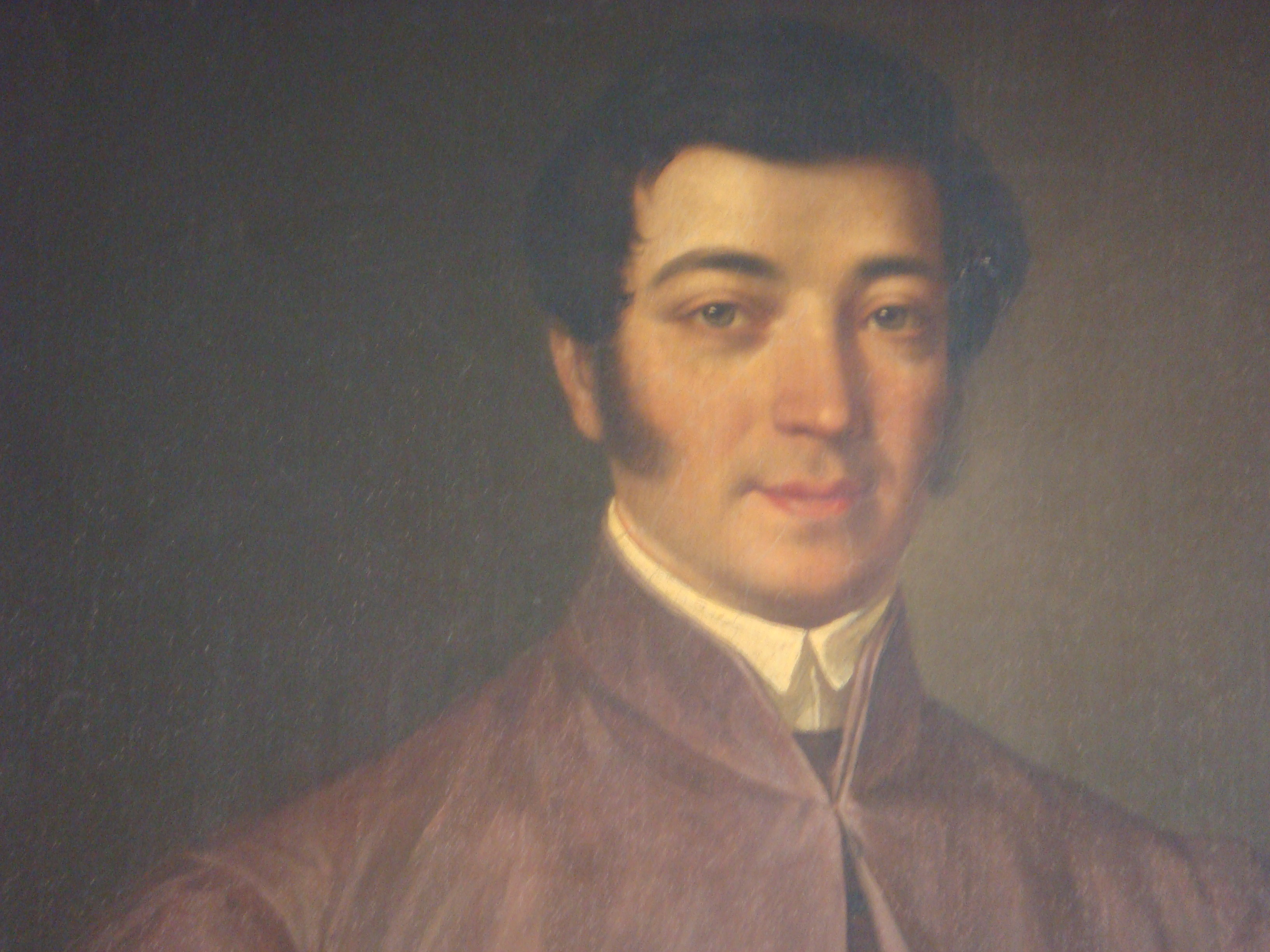
Portrait of Gaetano Moroni by Francesco Saverio Kaniewski

Gaetano Moroni (17 October 1802, Rome – 3 November 1883, Rome) was an Italian writer on the history and contemporary structure of the Catholic Church and an official of the papal court in Rome. He was the author of the well-known Dizionario di erudizione storico-ecclesiastica (Dictionary of historical-ecclesiastical learning).

== Biography ==
He received his early education from the Brothers of the Christian Schools at Rome. Apprenticed later to a barber, his duties frequently took him to the Camaldolese Monastery of Saint Gregory the Great on the Coelian Hill. The prior there, Dom Mauro Cappellari, O.S.B. Cam., and several of the monks recognized his exceptional gifts, and made use of him in a quasi-secretarial capacity. When Cappellari became a cardinal he made Moroni his chamberlain, and when he became Pope Gregory XVI, he employed Moroni to serve as his First Assistant of the Chamber, employing him also as his private secretary. In that capacity Moroni personally wrote over 100,000 letters during his lifetime. Moroni also later served Pope Pius IX as an Assistant of the Chamber.

Among the books of the monastery and of the cardinal, as well as from conversations with learned people, Moroni acquired a vast store of information. He also gradually collected a considerable private library bearing on ecclesiastical questions, while he made notes from daily papers and from other publications for his own instruction. The subsequent arrangement of these notes in order suggested to him the idea of turning his labours to the benefit of the public, an idea which he realized in the Dictionary, a mine of interesting data and authoritative in matters concerning the Pontifical Court, the organization of the Curia and the Church, and the administration of the Papal States. In matters of history, it depends on the writers whom its author consulted. It is, however, not a well-ordered or homogeneous work, but these defects may be readily forgiven since its author did his work alone, without real collaboration, and wrote at times sixteen hours a day.

Moroni was also the author of official articles on papal ceremonies, the journeys of the popes, etc. During the conclaves of 1829 and 1831, he wrote the Giornale storico-politico-eremoniale delle sede vacante e il conclave per l'elezione di Pio VIII e Gregorio XVI, which, like others of his writings remained unpublished. As a member of the household of Pope Gregory XVI, Moroni was the object of much sectarian hatred. He was a friend of many cardinals, including Wiseman, and of other illustrious men. In the index of the Dictionary, he indicates the various passages of the work which speak of himself, and which thus constitute a kind of autobiography.
