= Krasyliv =

City in Khmelnytskyi Oblast, Ukraine

Krasyliv Красилів
- City
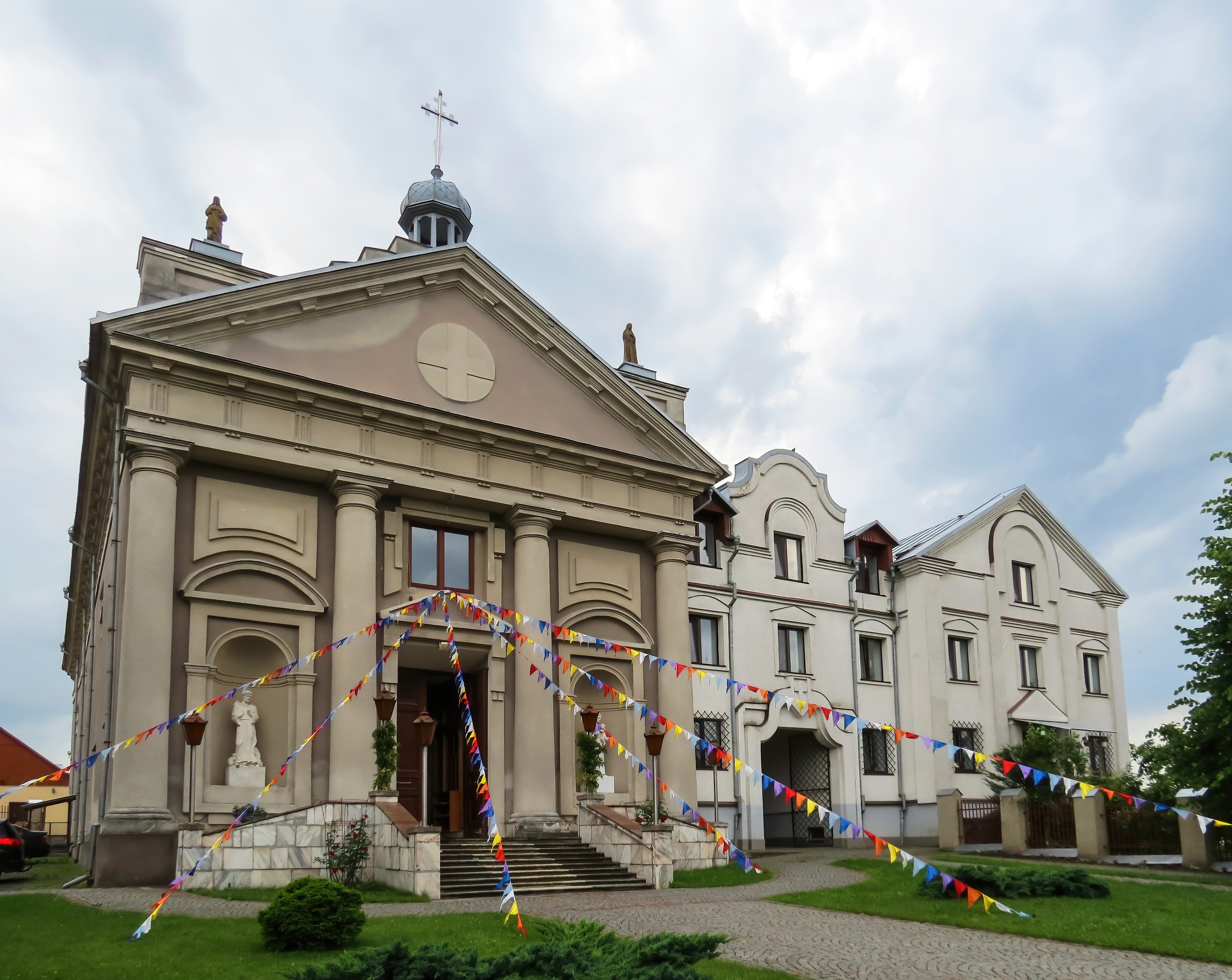
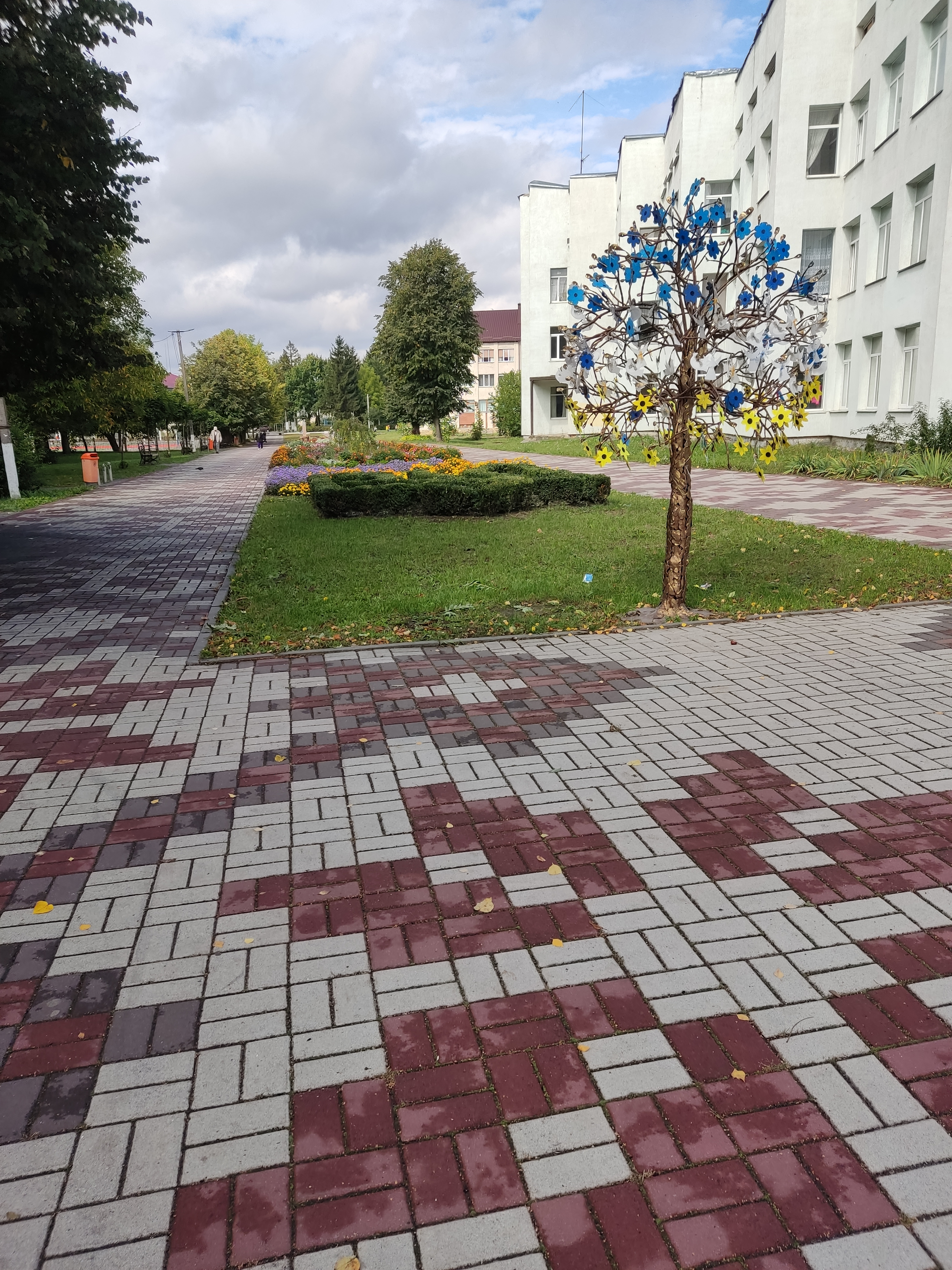
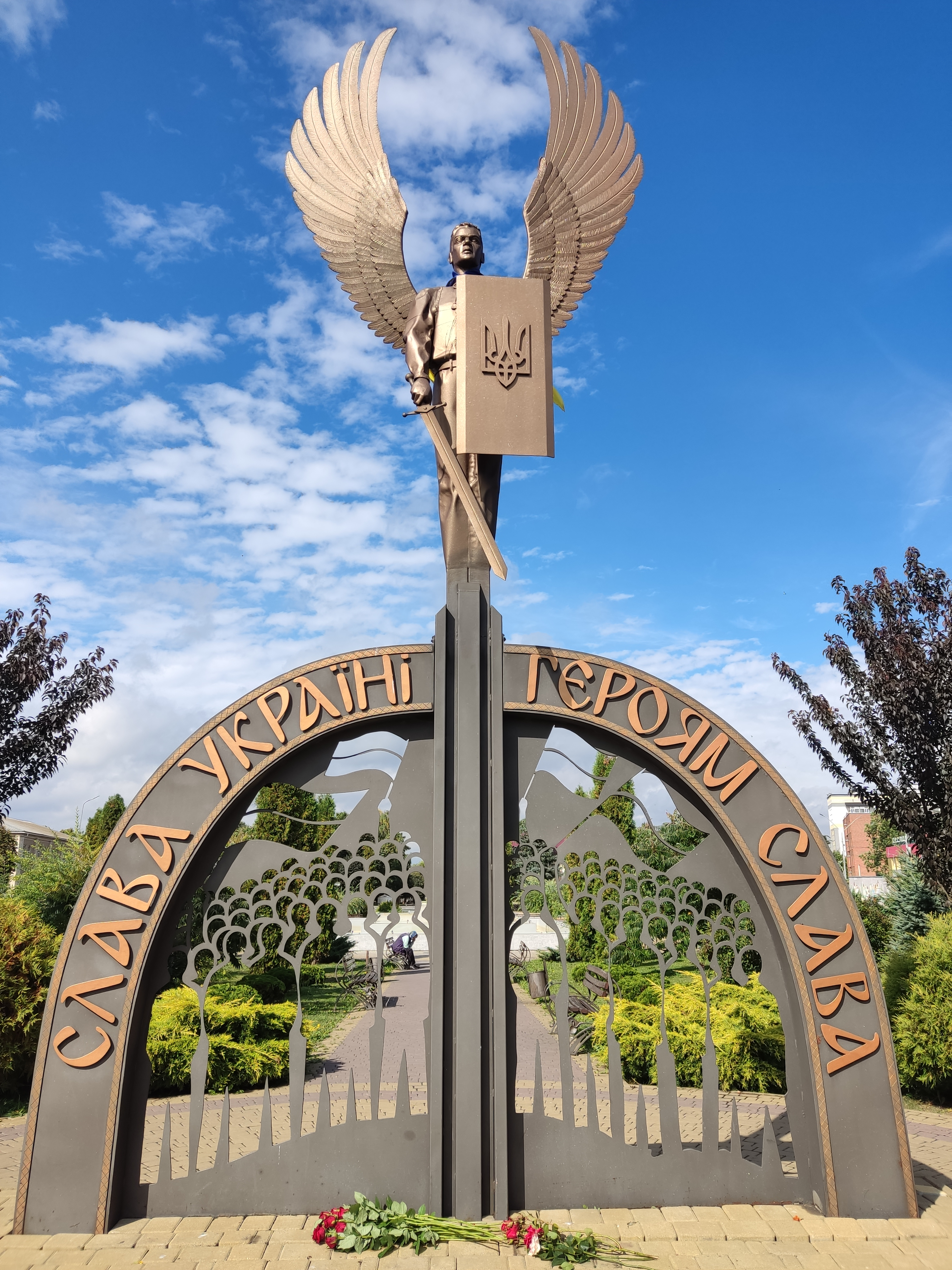
- Church of the Sacred Heart of Jesus Local Park of Recreation Monument to the Heavenly Hundred

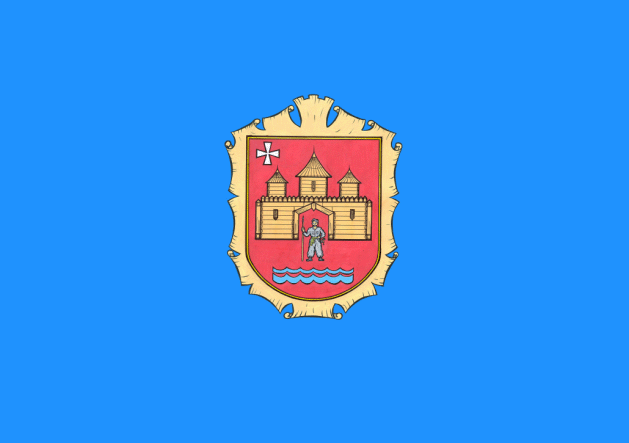
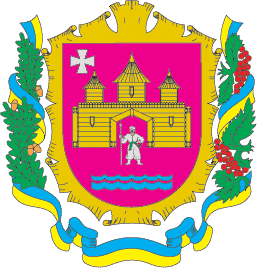
- Flag Coat of arms

- Location of Krasyliv in Ukraine Krasyliv (Khmelnytskyi Oblast)
- Coordinates: 49°39′7″N 26°58′14″E
- Country: Ukraine
- Oblast: Khmelnytskyi Oblast
- Raion: Khmelnytskyi Raion
- Hromada: Krasyliv urban hromada
- First mentioned: 1444

Area
  - Total: 28 km^{2} (11 sq mi)
- Elevation: 291 m (955 ft)

Population (2022)
  - Total: 18,356
- Website: http://krasyliv.org.ua

Krasyliv (Ukrainian: Красилів, IPA: [krɐˈsɪl⁽ʲ⁾iu̯]) is a city in Khmelnytskyi Raion, Khmelnytskyi Oblast (province), Ukraine. It hosts the administration of Krasyliv urban hromada, one of the hromadas of Ukraine. Its population is 18,356 (2022 estimate).

== History ==
During World War II, the village was occupied by Germany from 1941 to 1944. In 1941, the occupiers implemented anti-Jewish measures; i.e. ordered wearing yellow badges and performing forced labour, and prohibited the Jews from leaving the town. In late 1941, the occupiers established a ghetto for Jews from Krasyliv and other nearby localities, excluding Jewish craftsmen. In May 1942, the majority of Jews were moved to a forced labour in Orlintsy. In July 1942, the remaining Jews from the ghetto were mass murdered in the nearby village of Manivtsy. The remaining Jewish craftsmen were then moved to the ghetto, before it was liquidated in September 1942, and most Jews mass murdered in Manivtsy. Around 30 Jews escaped, but many were soon caught and murdered.

Until 18 July 2020, Krasyliv was the administrative center of Krasyliv Raion. The raion was abolished in July 2020 as part of the administrative reform of Ukraine, which reduced the number of raions of Khmelnytskyi Oblast to three. The area of Krasyliv Raion was merged into Khmelnytskyi Raion.

== Notable people ==
- Jan Ksawery Kaniewski (1805– 1867), Polish painter

== Gallery ==
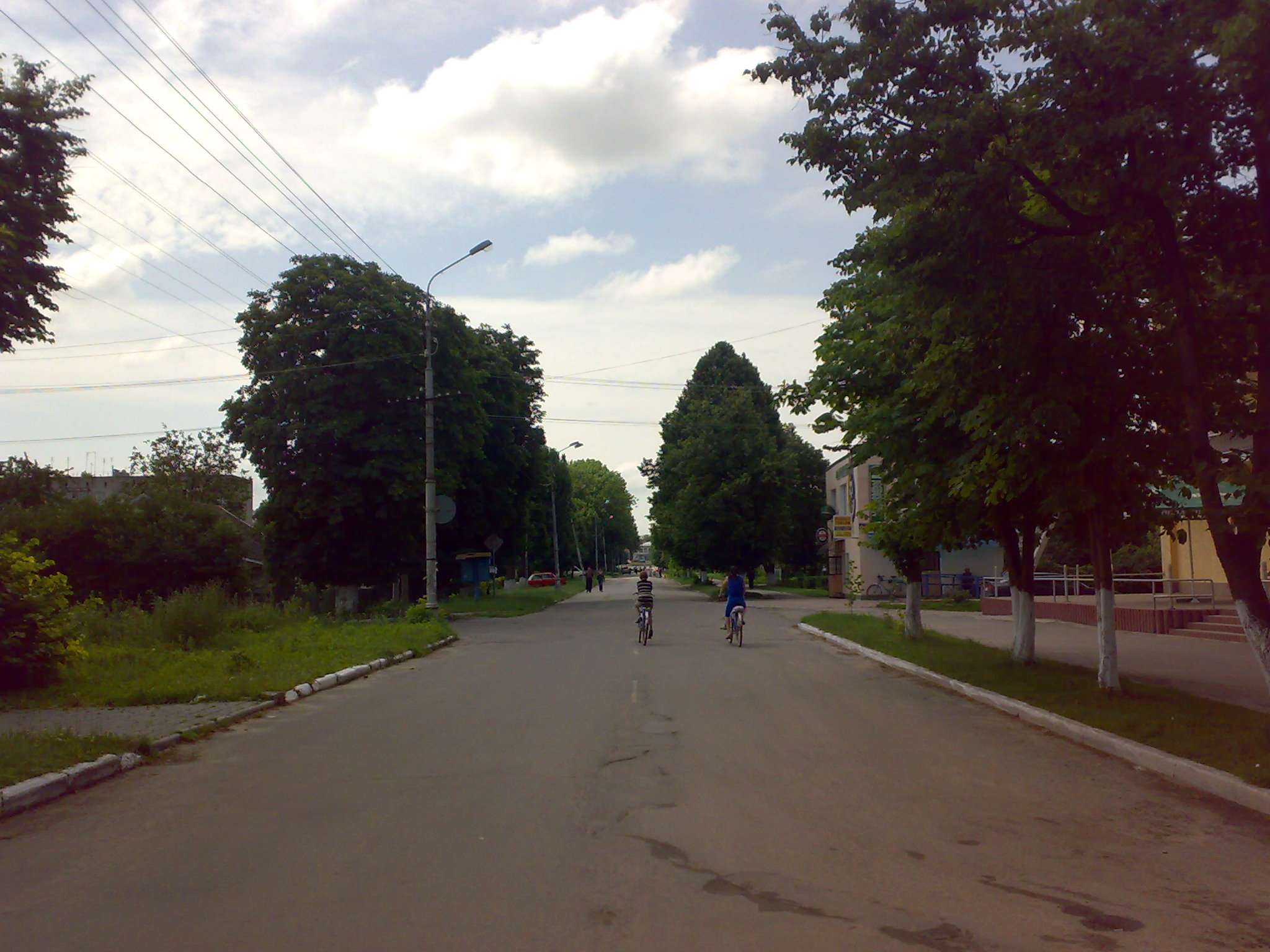
A street in Krasyliv

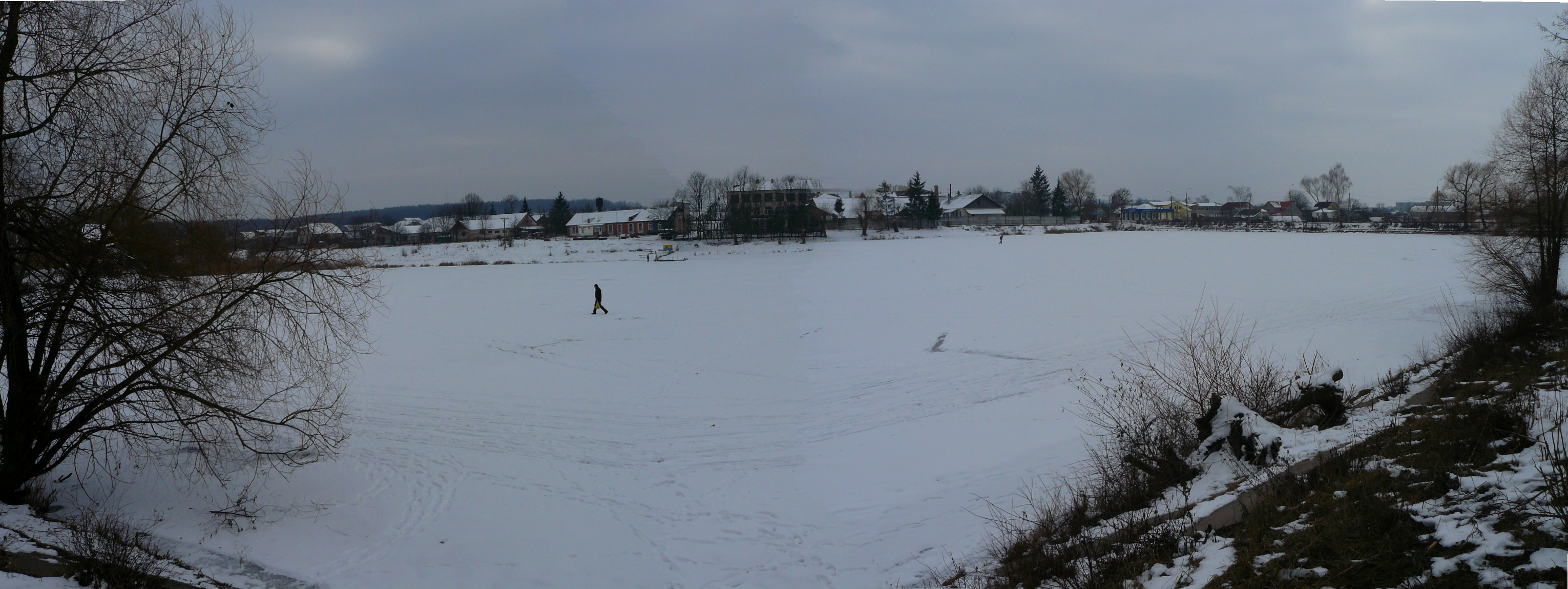
Levada pond

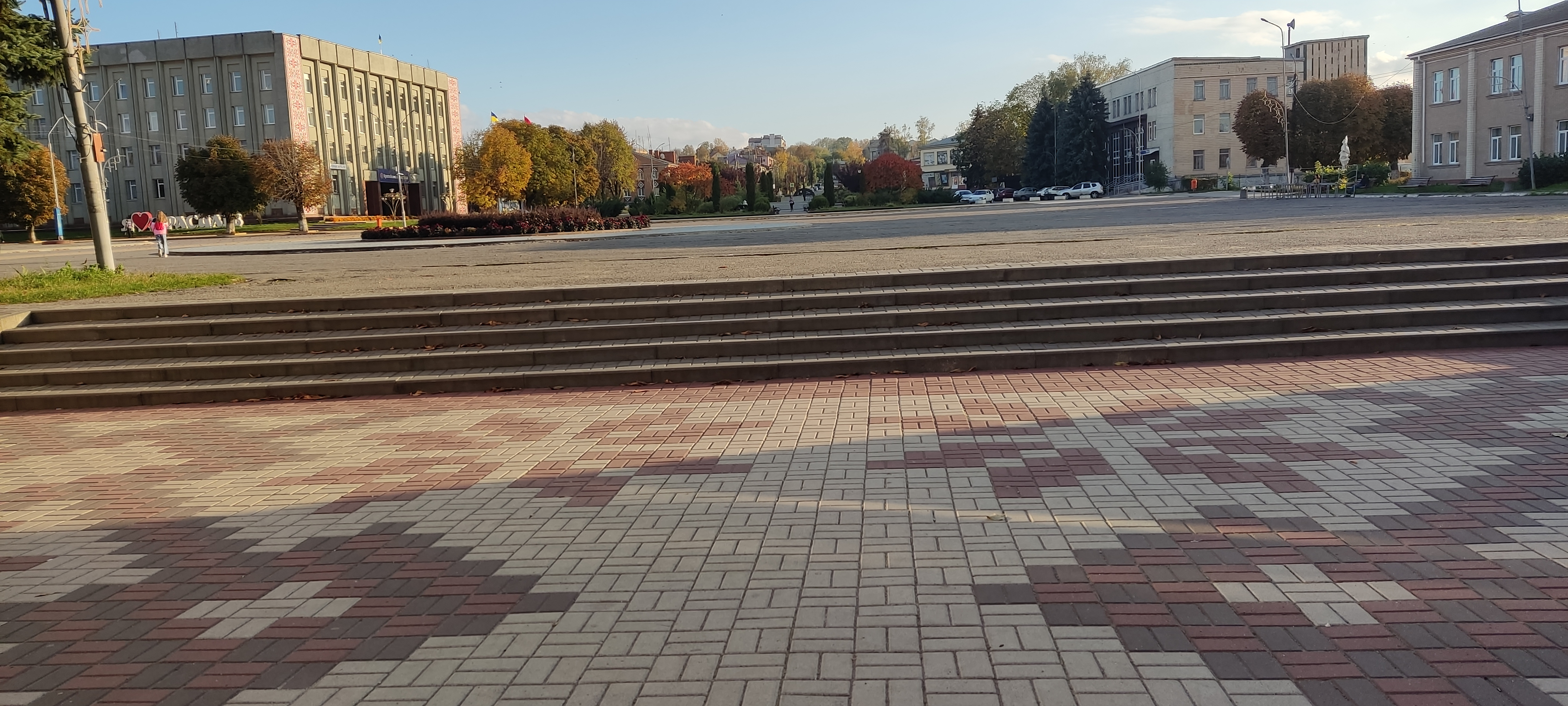
Central Square

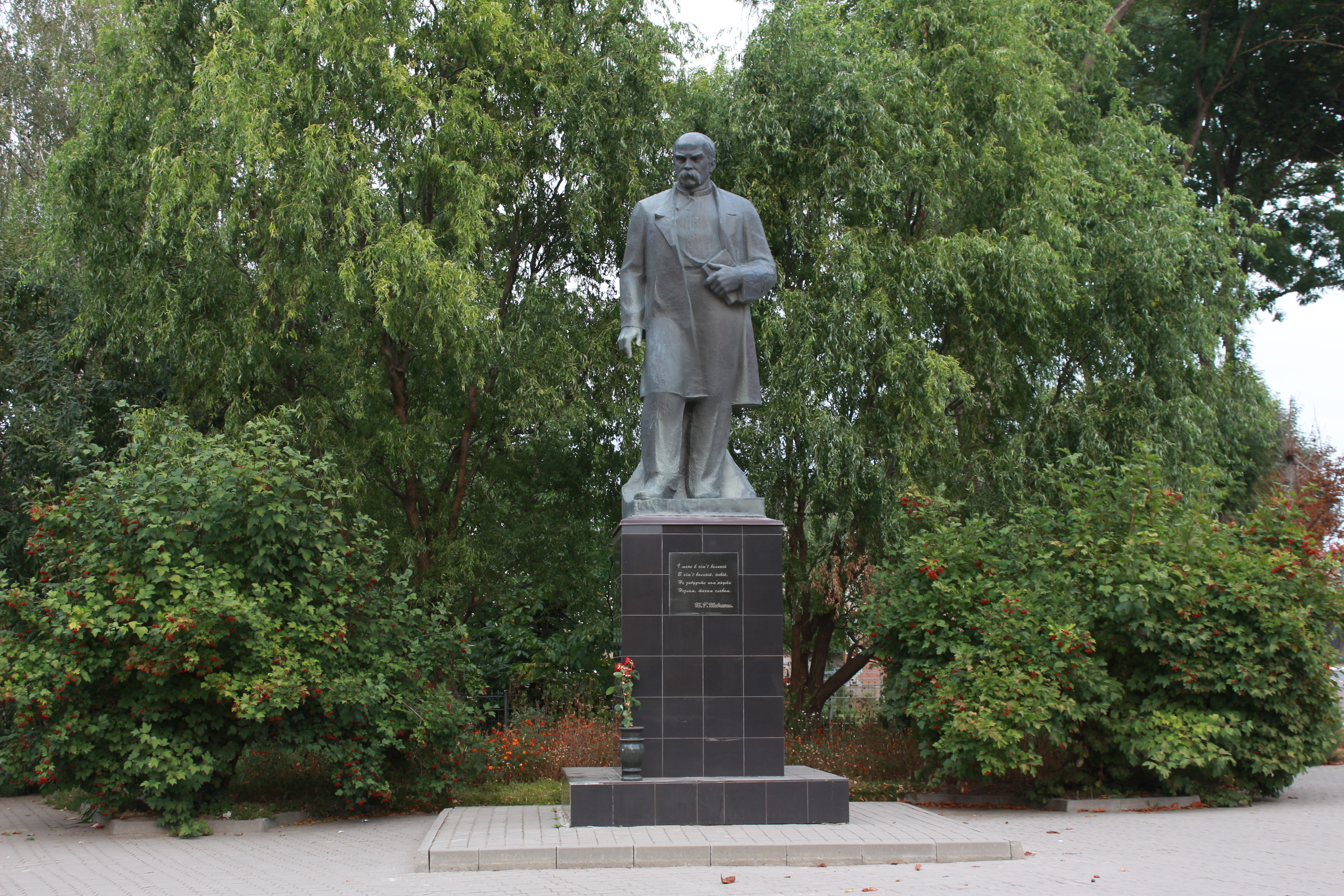
Statue of Taras Shevchenko

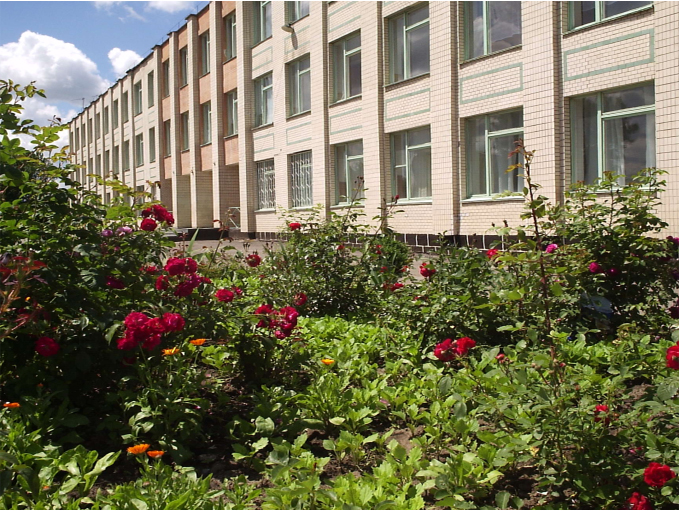
School

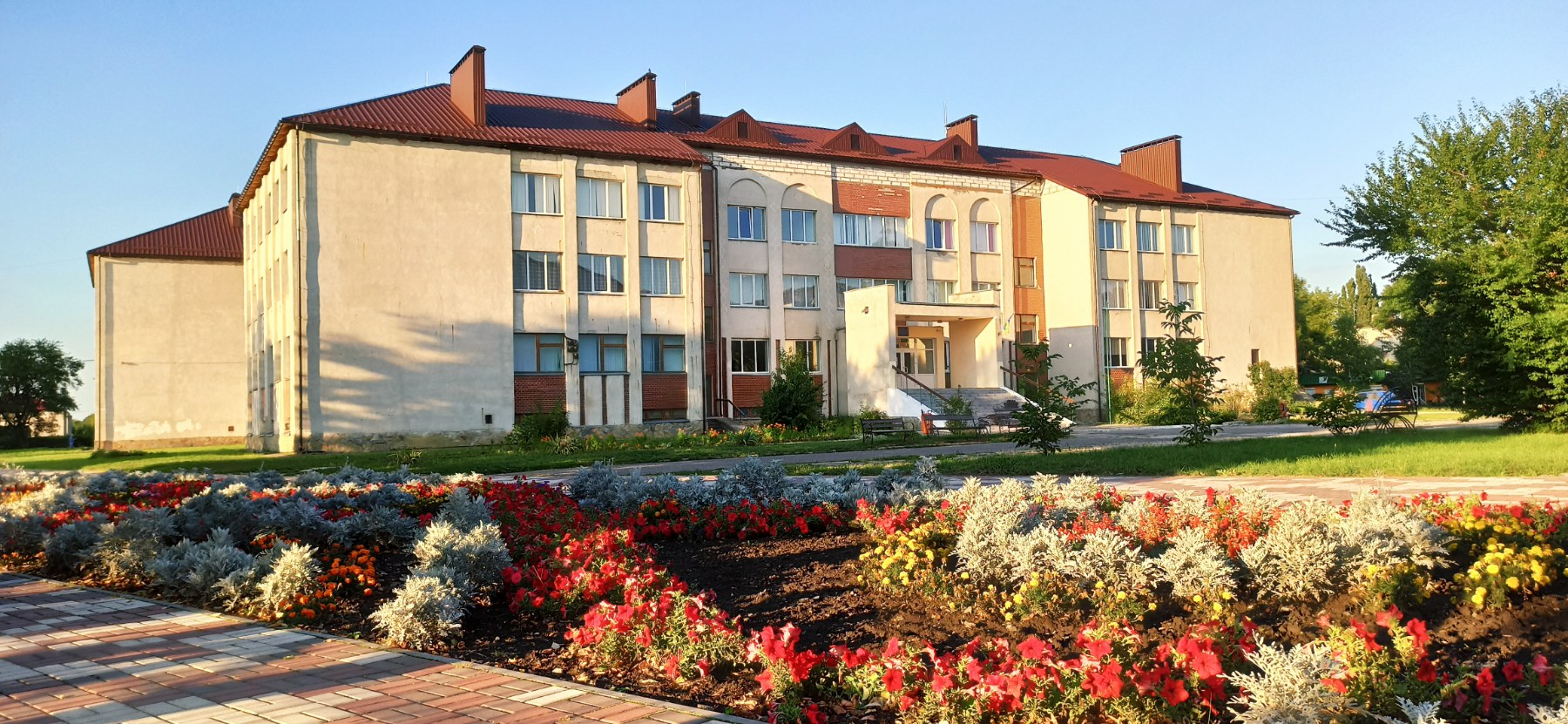
Lyceum
