= Tadeusz Czacki =

Polish historian, pedagogue and numismatist (1765–1813)

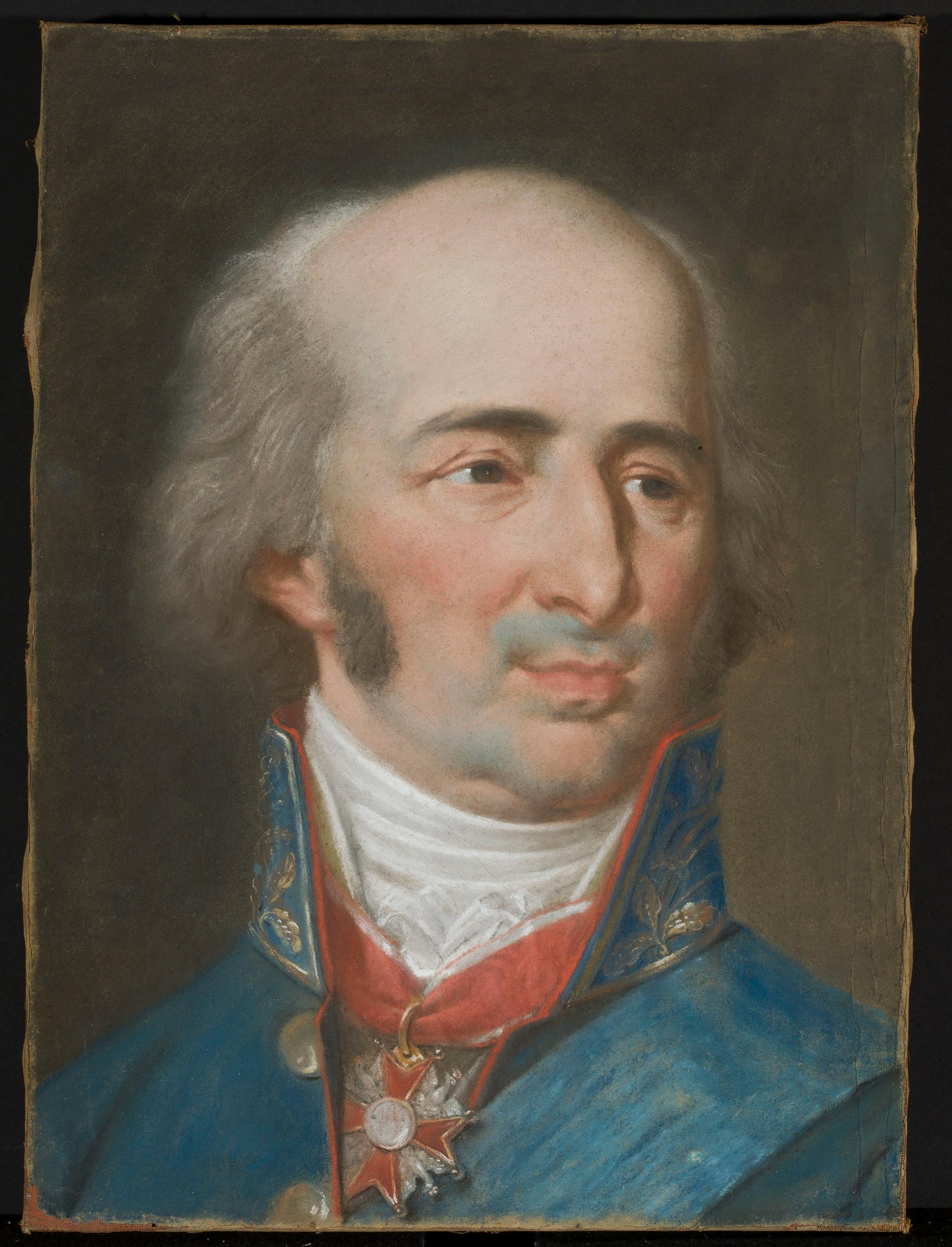
Portrait by Józef Pitschmann, c. 1805

Tadeusz Czacki (28 August 1765 in Poryck, Volhynia – 8 February 1813 in Dubno) was a Polish historian, pedagogue and numismatist. Czacki played an important part in the Enlightenment in Poland.

== Biography ==
Czacki was born in Poryck in Volhynia, Polish–Lithuanian Commonwealth, now Pavlivka in Ukraine. When Prince Adam Kazimierz Czartoryski was placed at the head of the educational district of Vilnius, Czacki was appointed school inspector of Volhynia, Podolia, and Ukraine. An opponent of the Jesuits, he combated their work in the field of pedagogy, and on one occasion raised by public subscription the sum of two million Polish florins to insure the existence of the gymnasiums in Vinnytsia and Kiev. In 1805, he founded the Krzemieniec Lyceum. After Czacki's death his heart was deposited in one of the halls of this Volhynian school, under the inscription "Ubi thesaurus tuus, ibi est cor tuum" (Where your treasury lies, there lies your heart). He discovered what was thought at the time to be the grave of Copernicus; however, controversy over its location continued long afterwards. He also was a panel member of the Commission of National Education, founded by Stanisław August Poniatowski in 1773 and considered to be the world's first ministry of education.

From 1786 to 1792 he worked for the Polish Commission of the Treasury and was responsible for supervising Jewish affairs in the country. During this time and afterwards, he worked for the emancipation of Jews in Poland. Exemption from the poll-tax was granted in 1775 to those who would apply themselves to agriculture, and by 1787, owing to Czacki's efforts while in the treasury (see his report of 1787 on the Ruthenian and Ukrainian provinces), he had the satisfaction of seeing a few scores of families enjoying that privilege. Furthermore, he co-wrote the Constitution of 3 May 1791, and founded the Warsaw Society of Friends of Learning.

In 1786 he was awarded the Order of Saint Stanislaus, and in 1792 the Order of the White Eagle.

== Writings ==
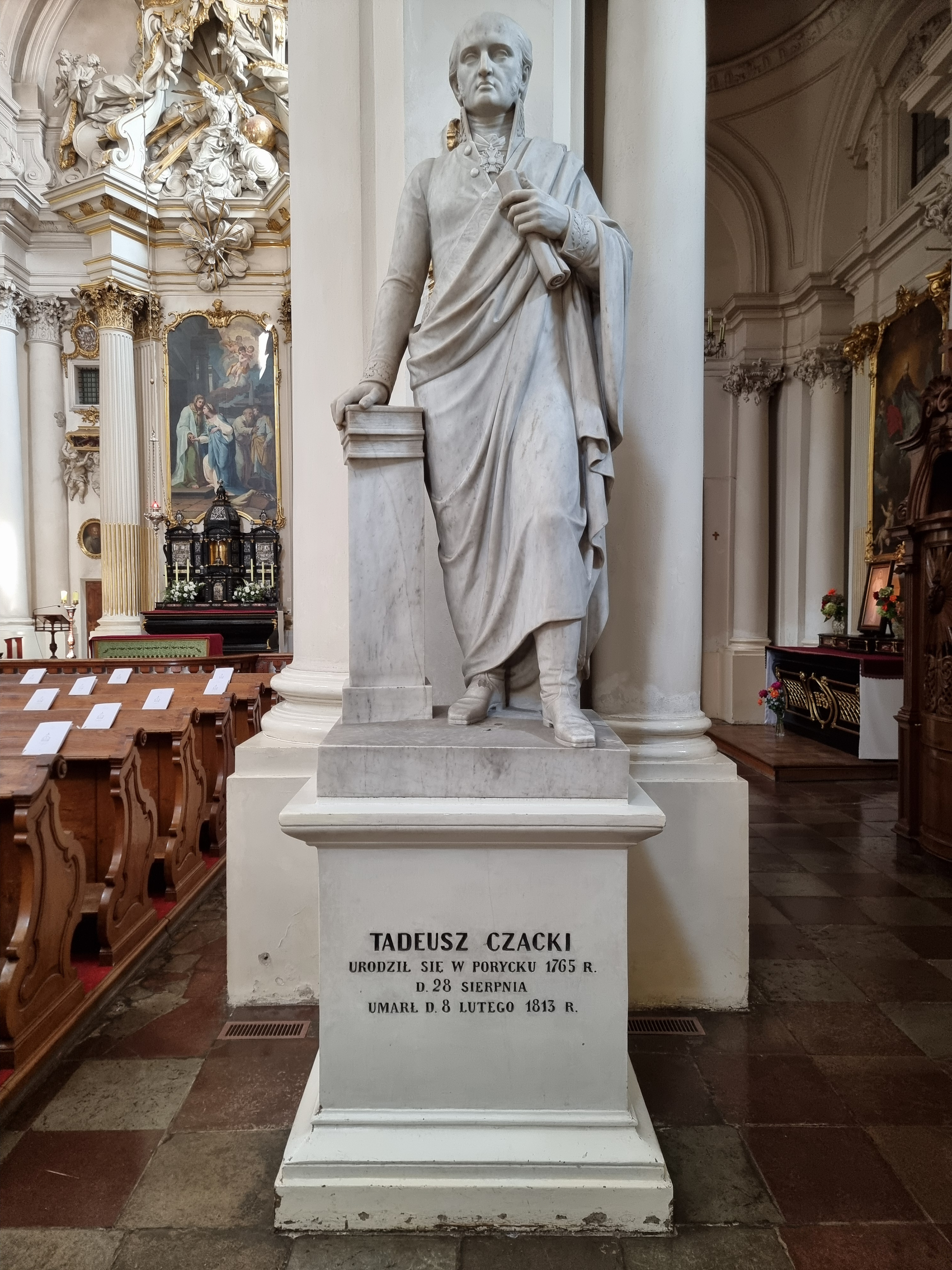
Monument dedicated to Czacki inside the Visitationist Church in Warsaw

Czacki's Rozprawa o Żydach (Discourse on the Jews), first published in Vilnius, 1807, and translated into Russian by Basil Anastaszewicz, passed through several editions, and was published finally in Dzieła Tadeusza Czackiego (Works of Tadeusz Czacki), edited by Edward Raczyński, Posen, 1845 (iii. 138-270). For the history of the Jewish institutions, Czacki, who did not know Hebrew, availed himself of the only sources open to him; namely, Bartolocci and Ugolino. After relating the early history of the Jews, Czacki describes their situation among the Arabs, Italians, Spaniards, French, Germans, and Hungarians. He tells of their entrance into Poland in the 12th century; of their intellectual condition; of their government and laws; and of the persecutions to which they were subjected.

He also wrote a short discourse on the Karaites (Dzieła Tadeusza Czackiego, iii. 271-285) which attempts to explain, on the basis of the sources accessible to the author and referred to above, "what the Karaites are, and wherein they chiefly differ from other Jews; when their separation occurred; and in what countries they dwell."

Czacki, who had been interested in the Lithuanian language, published a two-volume work on law, About Lithuanian and Polish Laws, Their Spirit, Their Origins and about Things Discussed in the First Lithuanian Statute of the year 1529 (Polish title: O litewskich i polskich prawach, o ich duchu, źródłach, związku i o rzeczach zawartych w pierwszem Statucie dla Litwy 1529 roku), explaining differences between the two nations of the former Commonwealth.

== See also ==
- History of philosophy in Poland
- List of Poles
