= Antoniny, Ukraine =

Rural locality in Khmelnytskyi Oblast, Ukraine

Antoniny Антоніни
- Rural settlement
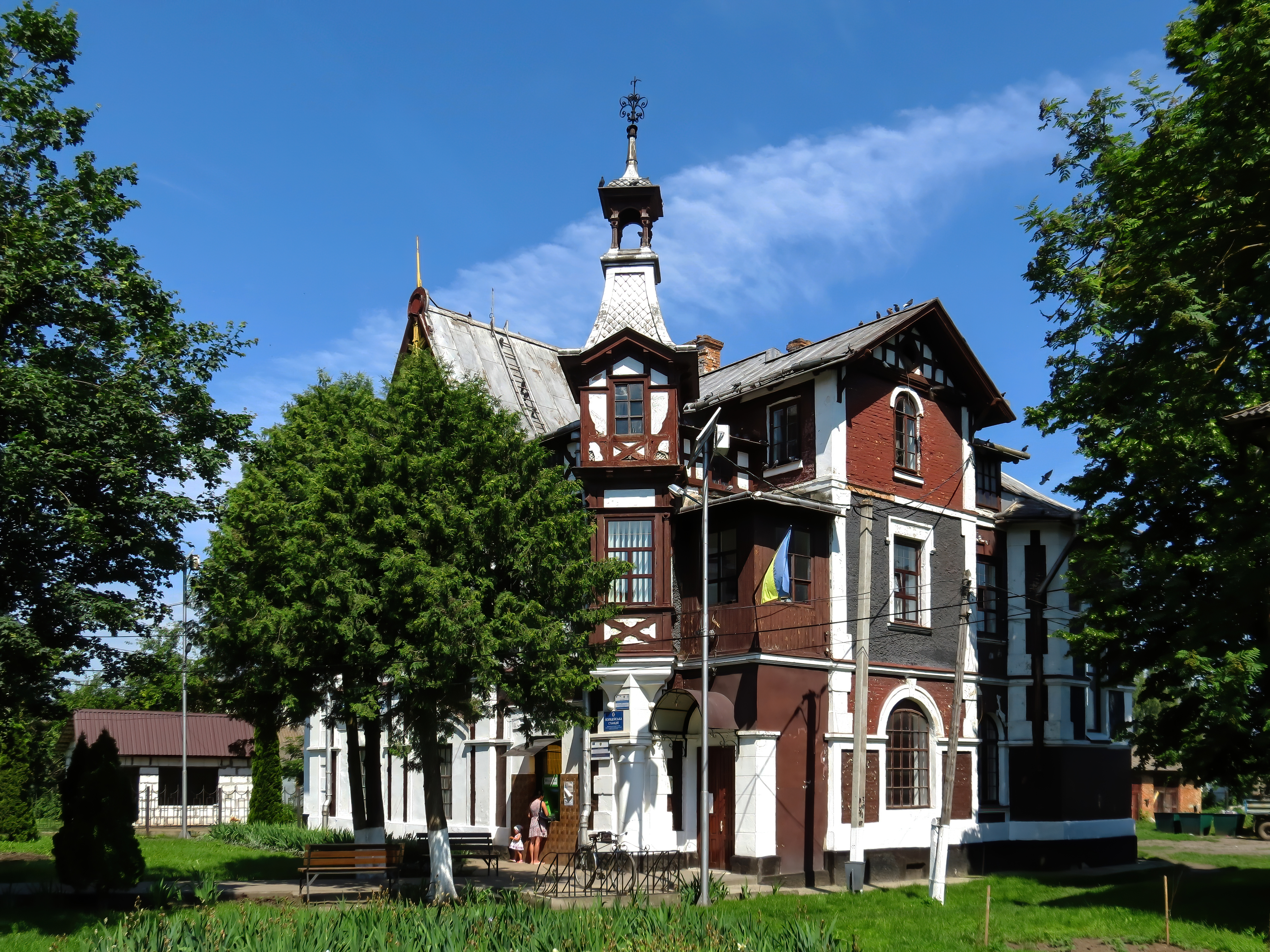
- Garage in Lenin Square, registered in the State Register of Immovable Landmarks of Ukraine.

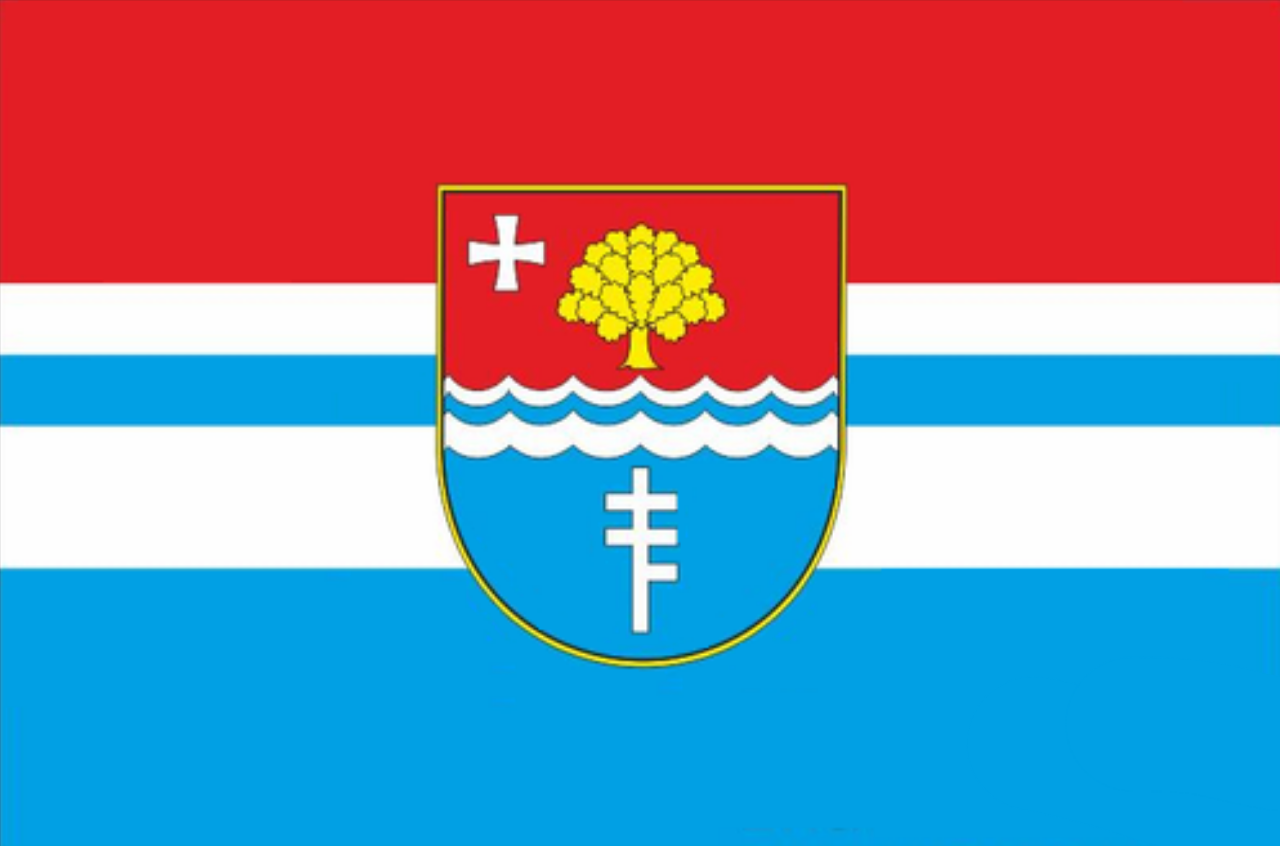
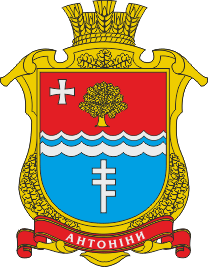
- Flag Coat of arms

- Location of Antoniny in Khmelnytskyi Oblast Antoniny (Ukraine)
- Coordinates: 49°48′30″N 26°52′00″E
- Country: Ukraine
- Oblast: Khmelnytskyi Oblast
- Raion: Khmelnytskyi Raion
- Hromada: Antoniny settlement hromada
- Founded: 14th century
- Town status: 1956

Government
  - Town Head: Nataliya Kondratyuk

Area
  - Total: 4.6 km^{2} (1.8 sq mi)
- Elevation: 290 m (950 ft)

Population (2022)
  - Total: 2,111 ▼
  - Density: 460/km^{2} (1,200/sq mi)
- Time zone: UTC+2 (EET)
  - Summer (DST): UTC+3 (EEST)
- Postal code: 28153
- Area code: +380 3855
- Website: http://rada.gov.ua/

Antoniny (Ukrainian: Антоніни, Yiddish: אנטאנין, romanized: Antonin), formerly known as Holodky (Голодьки) and Antonyny (Антонини), is a rural settlement in Khmelnytskyi Raion, Khmelnytskyi Oblast, western Ukraine. It hosts the administration of Antoniny settlement hromada, one of the hromadas of Ukraine. The settlement's population was 2,655 as of the 2001 Ukrainian Census and 2,111 (2022 estimate).

== Geography ==
The settlement is located in the eastern part of the historical region of Podillia, to the west of Starokostiantyniv.

== History ==
In the 1870s, the Neo-baroque Antoniny Palace was built in Antoniny by Austrian architects Fellner & Helmer for the noble Sanguszko and Potocki families. However, it was burned to the ground in a fire set by Bolsheviks in August 1919, and only the palace service buildings remain.

In June 1919 the village was a site of battles, in which the 3rd Iron Division of the Ukrainian People's Army together with the 1st Infantry Regiment of Ukrainian Sich Riflemen defeated Bolshevik forces.

In February 1930 the village was the centre of a quickly defeated anti-Soviet Union revolt.

During World War II, Antoniny was occupied by Nazi Germany from July 7, 1941, until March 5, 1944. The occupation authorities imposed a curfew, banned radio use, and closed local cultural and educational institutions.

By late 1941, German authorities forced the remaining Jewish residents of Antoniny into a designated ghetto in the town. In July 1942, Ukrainian auxiliary police took ghetto inmates to a forest near Manevtsy, southeast of Antoniny, where they were shot and buried in mass graves.

Until 18 July 2020, Antoniny belonged to Krasyliv Raion. The raion was abolished in July 2020 as part of the administrative reform of Ukraine, which reduced the number of raions of Khmelnytskyi Oblast to three. The area of Krasyliv Raion was merged into Khmelnytskyi Raion.

Until 26 January 2024, Antoniny was designated urban-type settlement. On this day, a new law entered into force which abolished this status, and Antoniny became a rural settlement.

== Demographics ==
Distribution of the population by native languages according to the 2001 census:

Native languages in Antoniny
	percent
Ukrainian	98.4%
Russian	0.9%
Armenian	0.6%
others	0.1%

== Notable people ==
- Anton Leontyuk (1918-1994), Hero of the Soviet Union
