= Jan Ksawery Kaniewski =

Polish painter (1805–1867)

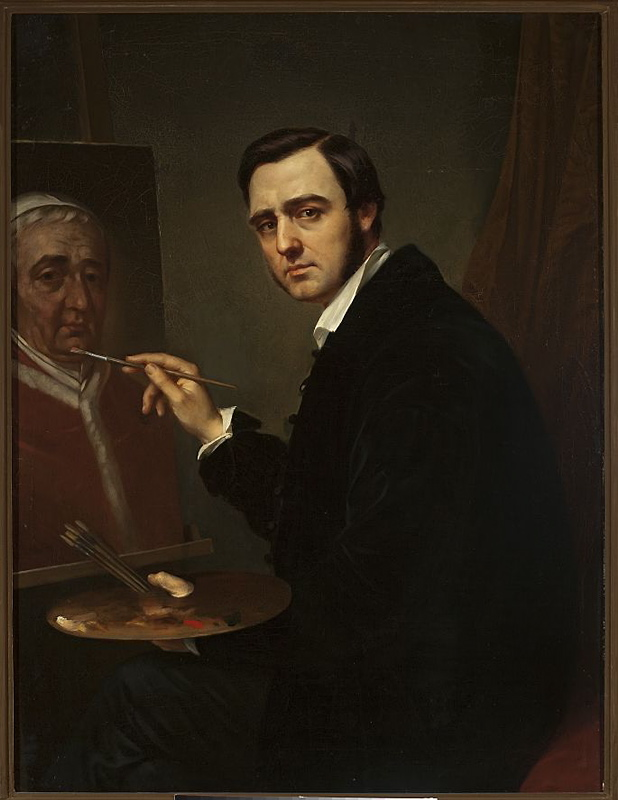
Self-Portrait at Easel, 1855; Museum Narodowe, Warsaw

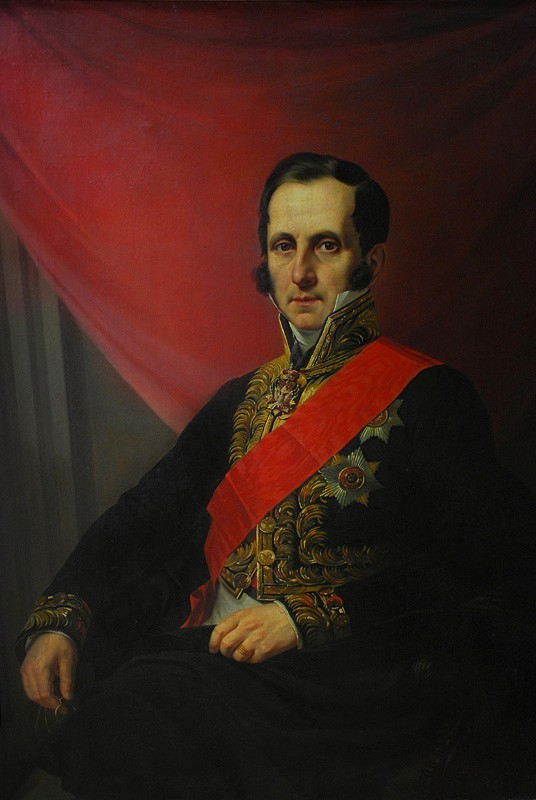
Count Sergey Uvarov, 1844; Pushkin House, St. Petersburg

Jan Ksawery Kaniewski, also known in Italian as Francesco Saverio Kaniewski (1805 – 13 April 1867) was a Polish painter trained in St. Petersburg who spent several years in Rome. He was particularly known for his portraits and his depictions of historical and Biblical scenes.

== Life and career ==
Kaniewski was born in Krasiłów, Krasyliv in Podolia, Ukraine. He was educated in the Liceum Krzemienieckie in Krzemieniec, where he received his first lessons in drawing and painting from Józef Pitschmann. Between 1827 and 1833 he studied in the Imperial Academy of Arts in St. Petersburg. After graduating with the title "free artist" (Polish: wolny artysta), he traveled to Rome thanks to a government grant, arriving in November 1833, via Dresden, Vienna, Bologna and Florence. In Rome he found fame, thanks to his portrait of Pope Gregory XVI, commissioned by Tsar Nicholas I, for which he was awarded the Order of the Golden Spur and was elected a member of the Accademia Virtuosi of the Pantheon. While in Rome he also painted Gaetano Moroni.

In the years 1842–1846 he was back in St. Petersburg, where in 1845, for his portrait of Prince Ivan Paskevich he received the title of Academician. In 1846 he moved to Warsaw, where after the death of Aleksander Kokular he occupied the chair of drawing and figure painting in the School of Fine Arts, of which from 1858 to 1864 he was director, with the patronage of Tsar Alexander II. In 1860 he became one of the organisers of the Society for the Encouragement of the Arts (Towarzystwo Zachęty Sztuk Pięknych), with which he remained associated until the end of his life.

After the School of Fine Arts was forcibly closed in 1864, Kaniewski continued to lead a drawing class.

His work included many portraits of members of the Russian Imperial family, including Tsar Alexander II, and dignitaries of Congress Poland.
