= Shepetivka urban hromada =

Urban hromada of Khmelnytskyi Oblast, Ukraine

Shepetivka urban hromada Шепетівська міська громада
- Hromada
- Seal

- Location within Khmelnytskyi Oblast Location within Ukraine
- Coordinates: 50°11′0″N 27°04′0″E
- Country: Ukraine
- Oblast: Khmelnytskyi Oblast
- Raion: Shepetivka Raion

Area
  - Total: 172.8 km^{2} (66.7 sq mi)

Population (2023)
  - Total: 46,270
- Website: shepetivka-rada.gov.ua

Shepetivka urban territorial hromada (Ukrainian: Шепетівська міська територіальна громада, romanized: Shepetivska miska terytorialna hromada) is one of the hromadas of Ukraine, located in Shepetivka Raion in northern Khmelnytskyi Oblast. Its administrative centre is the city of Shepetivka.

The hromada has a total population of 46,270 (as of 2023), as well as an area of 172.8 km^{2} (66.7 mi^{2}).

== Composition ==
In addition to one city (Shepetivka), the hromada contains three villages:

- Plesna
- Plishchyn
- Zhylyntsi
