= Józef Pitschmann =

Austrian-born Polish painter (1758–1834)

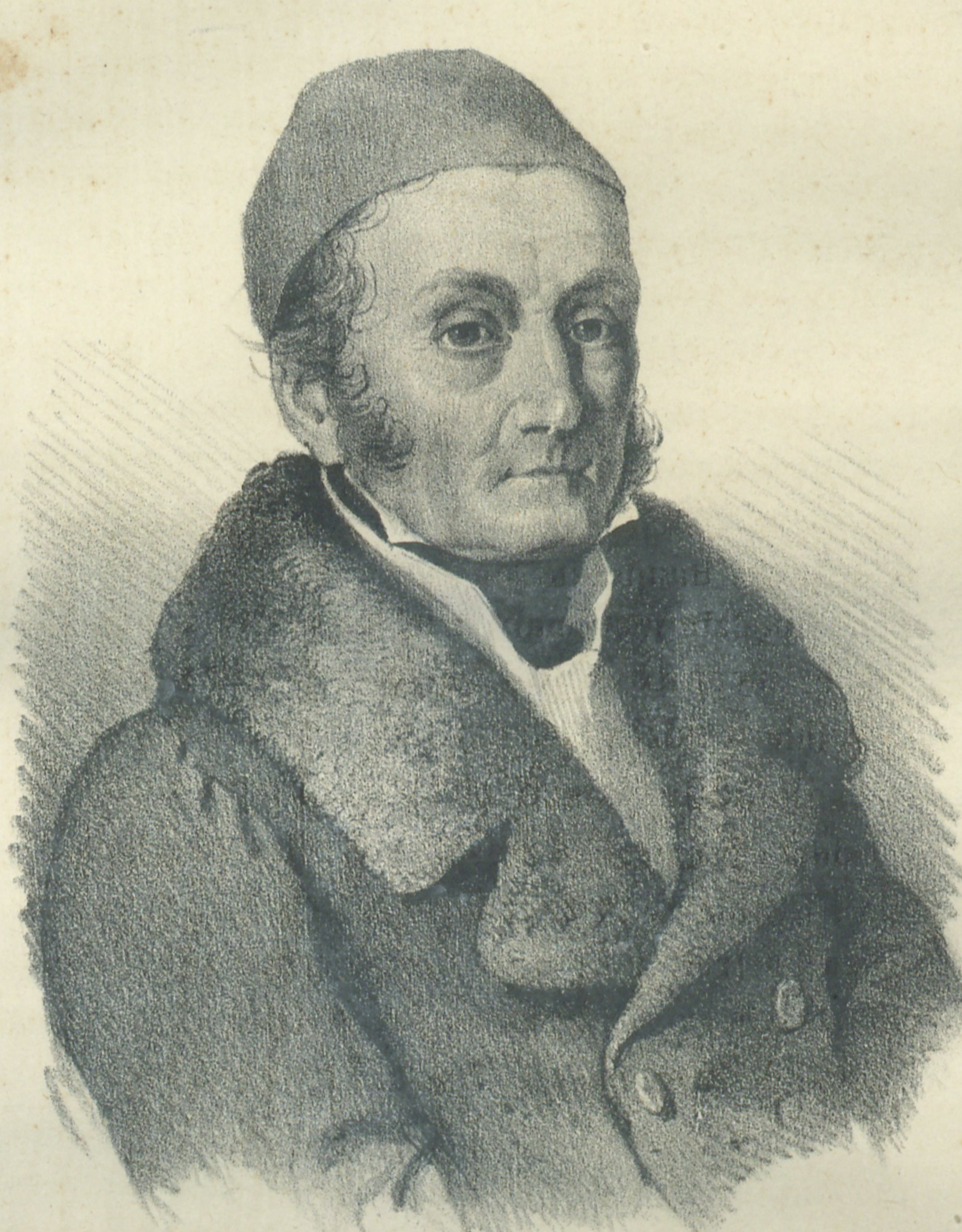
- Józef Pitschmann; portrait by Jan Feliks Piwarski.
- Born: 1758; Trieste
- Died: 1834 (aged 75–76); Krzemieniec
- Occupation: painter

Józef Franciszek Jan Pitschmann, or Franz Joseph Pitschmann (1758 – 1 September 1834) was an Austrian-born Polish portrait painter.

== Biography ==
He was born in Trieste. He began his artistic studies at the Academy of Fine Arts, Vienna, under the direction of Heinrich Carl Brandt, a noted portrait painter. In 1787, he was awarded a gold medal for his depiction of Hercules returning Admetus to Alcestis, and was made a member of the Academy.

In 1788, he moved to Poland at the invitation of Józef Klemens Czartoryski, living in his home in Korzec while working as a portrait painter and art teacher. From 1789 to 1794, he lived in Warsaw where he painted for the nobility and the bourgeoisie; notably several portraits of King Stanisław II August, for which he was awarded a diamond ring. In 1794, he moved to Lwów, where he lived until 1806. While there, he is known to have produced over 300 portraits, including one of Emperor Francis I and his wife.

In 1806, Tadeusz Czacki offered him a position at the new Krzemieniec Lyceum, where he became a drawing teacher. He also gave private lessons. During this time, he created an additional 150 portraits, mostly of the professors at the school and the local nobility, and received several awards from the Emperor. His best-known student was Jan Ksawery Kaniewski. After his retirement, he remained in Krzemieniec and died there.

== Selected portraits ==
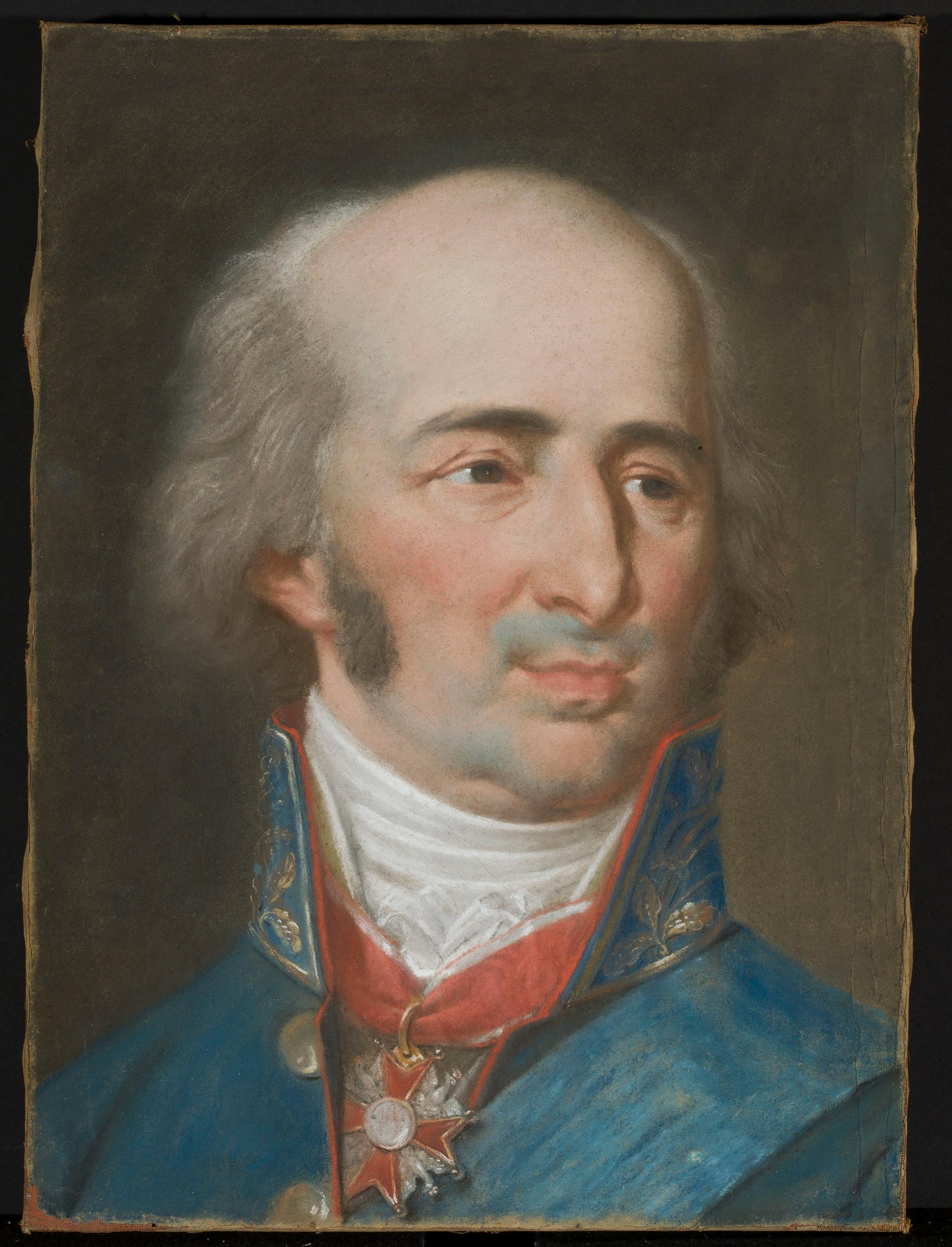
Tadeusz Czacki

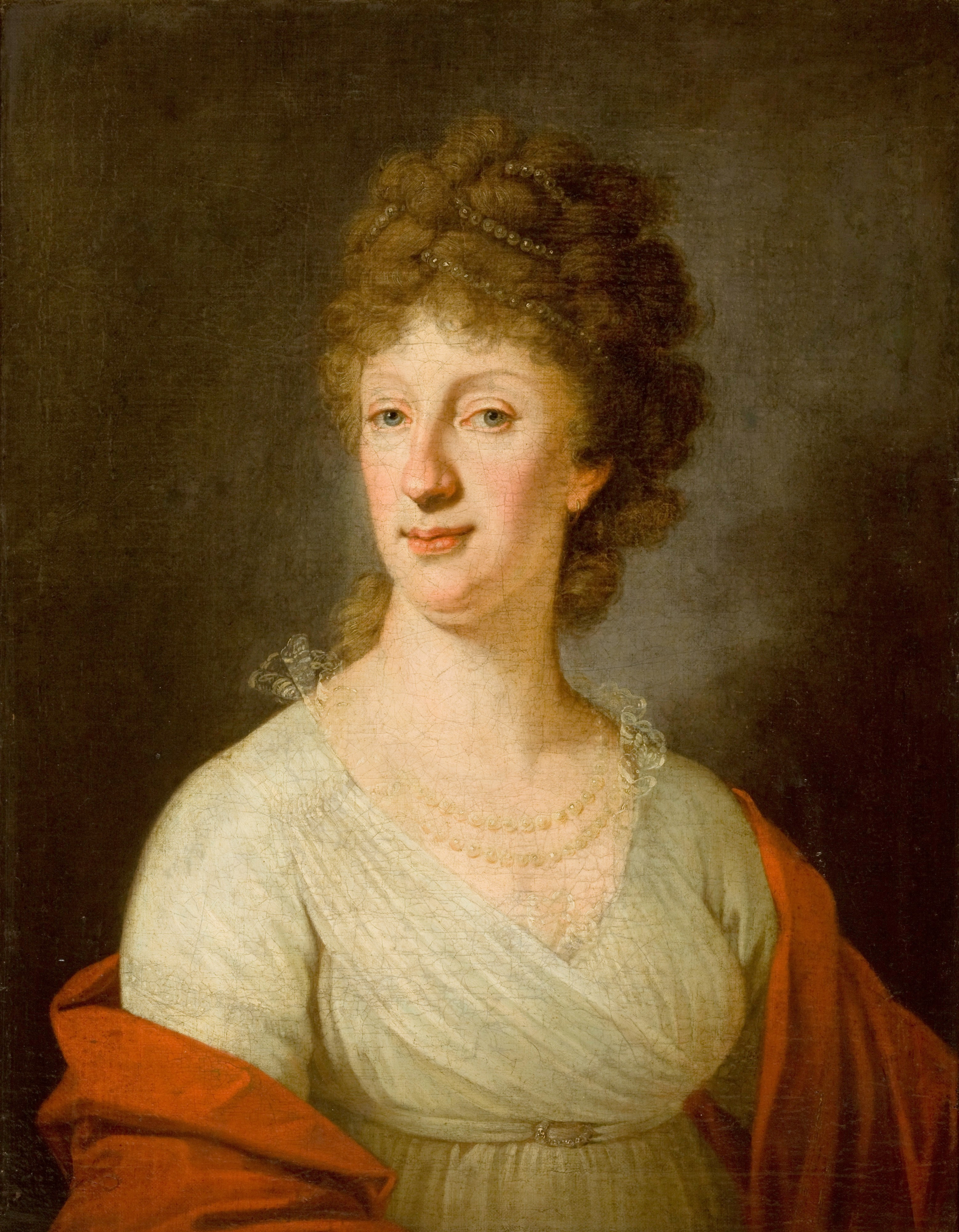
Maria Theresa of Austria

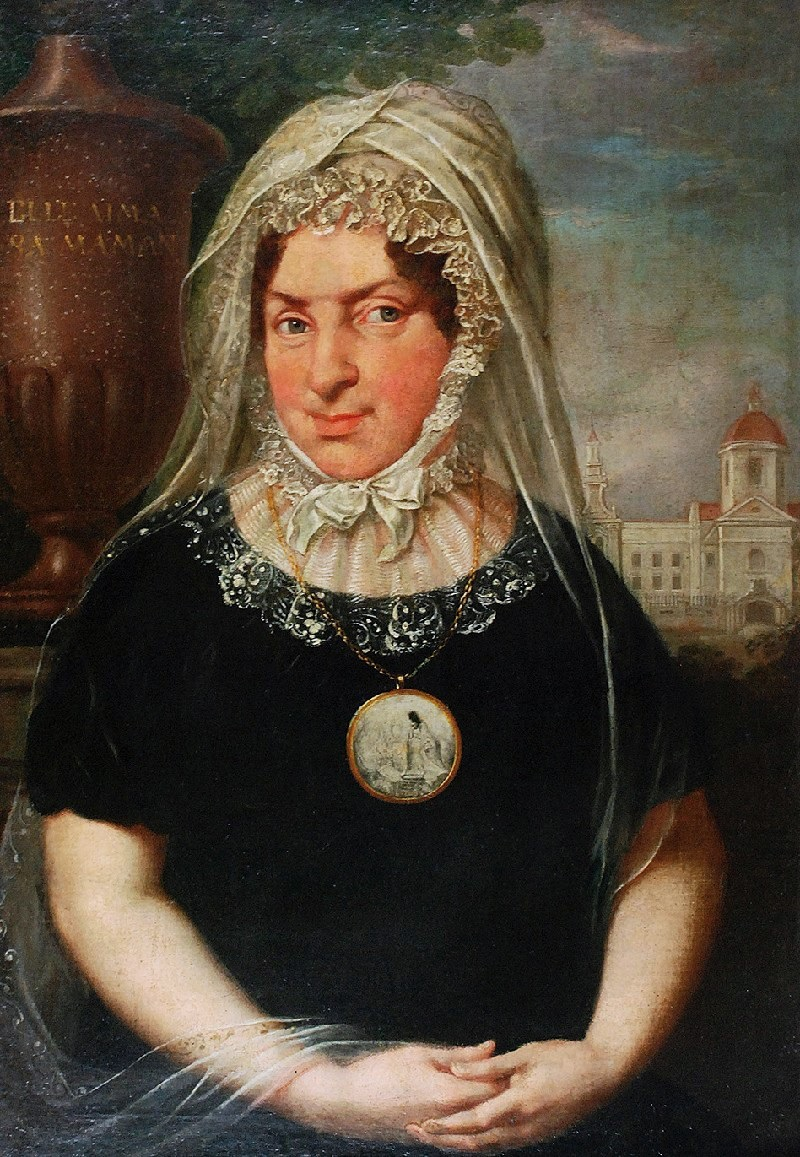
Teresa Stadnicka

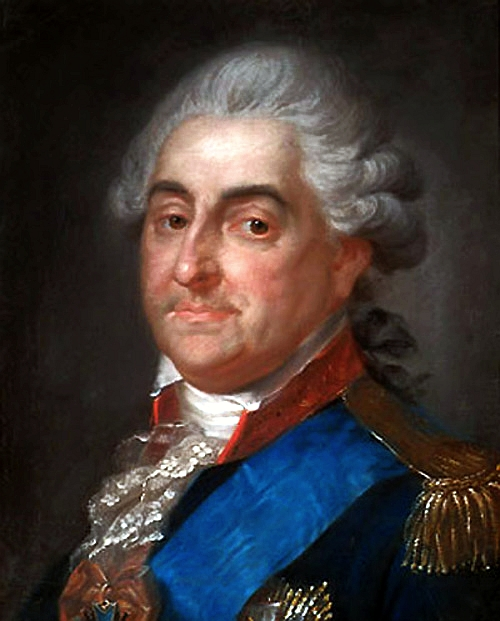
Pastel of King
Stanisław II August
