= Antoniny settlement hromada =

Antoniny settlement hromada Антонінська селищна громада
- Hromada
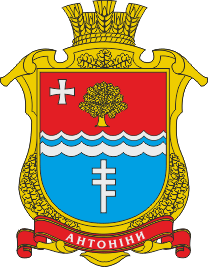
- Seal
- Interactive map of Antoniny settlement hromada
- Country: Ukraine
- Oblast: Khmelnytskyi Oblast
- Raion: Khmelnytskyi Raion
- Founded: 2017

Area
  - Total: 392.7 km^{2} (151.6 sq mi)

Population
  - Total: 10,339
- Website: antoninska-gromada.gov.ua

Antoniny settlement hromada (Ukrainian: Антонінська селищна громада) is one of the hromadas of Khmelnytskyi Raion in Khmelnytskyi Oblast in Ukraine. Its administrative centre is the rural settlement of Antoniny.

== Composition ==
The hromada encompasses 34 localities, which include the rural settlement of Antoniny (administrative centre) and 33 villages:

- Dolynivtsi
- Fedorivka
- Hrytsenky
- Kliuchivka
- Korchivka
- Krasivka
- Kremenchuky
- Kryvorudka
- Kuchmanivka
- Ledianka
- Lisova Volytsia
- Mala Salykha
- Malenky
- Mali Puzyrky
- Mali Yunachky
- Medtsi
- Nova Kryvorudka
- Novi Tereshky
- Reshnivka
- Rublianka
- Sevriuky
- Tereshky
- Trusylivka
- Trisky
- Vaskivchyky
- Velyka Medvedivka
- Velyka Salykha
- Velyki Orlyntsi
- Velyki Yunachky
- Yakymivtsi
- Yuzino
- Zakrynychchia
- Zelena
