= Shepetivka =

City in Khmelnytskyi Oblast, Ukraine

Shepetivka Шепетівка
- City
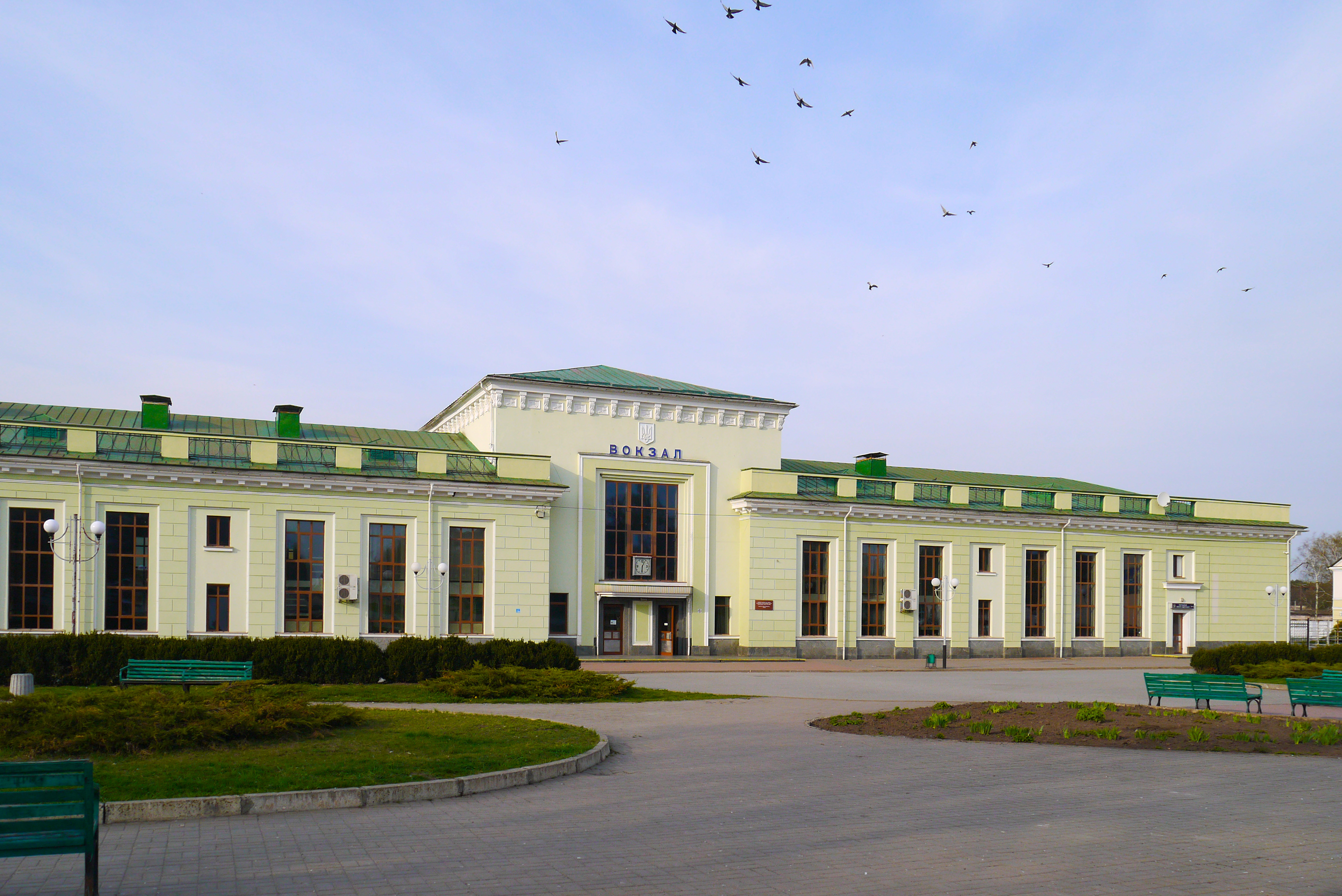
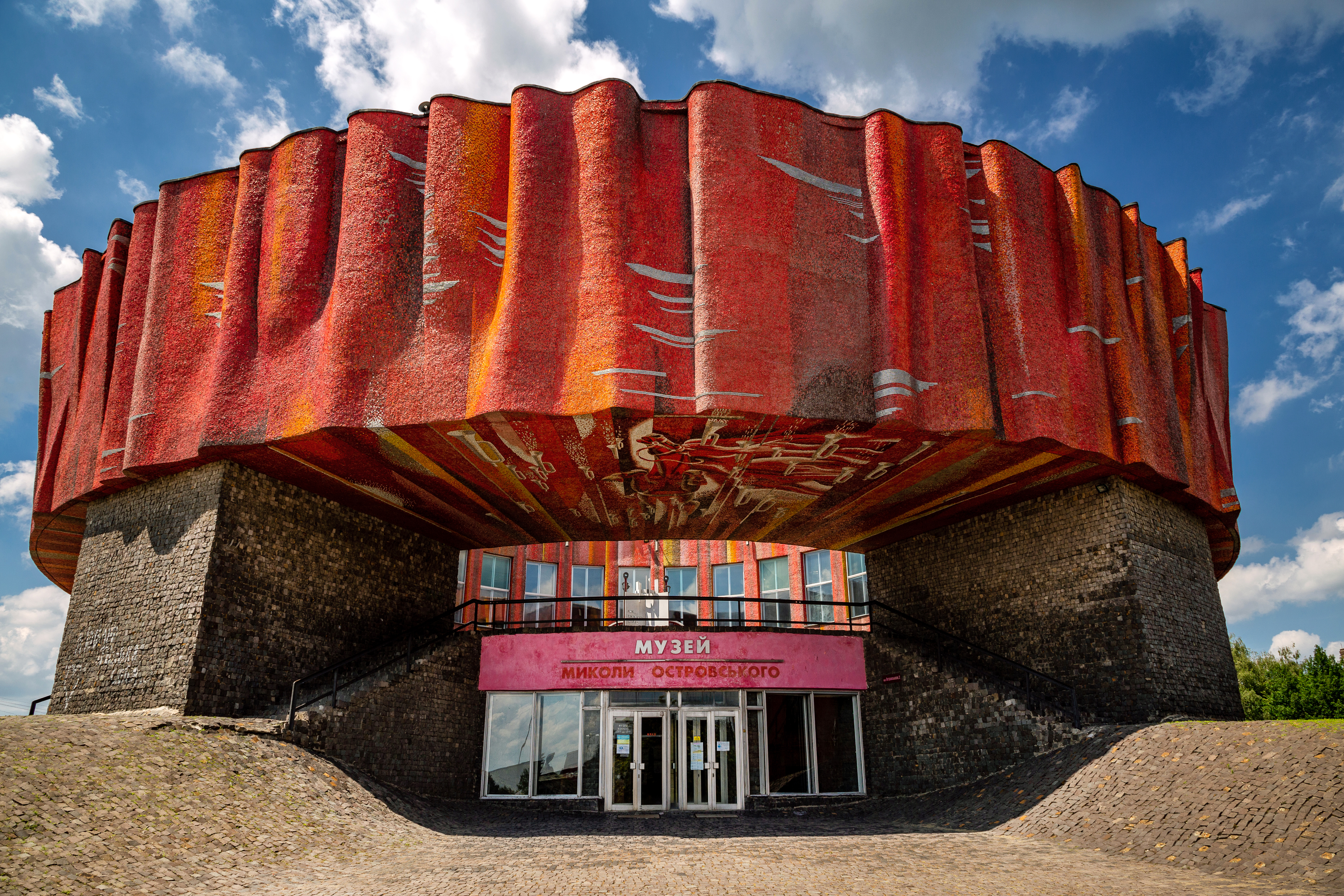
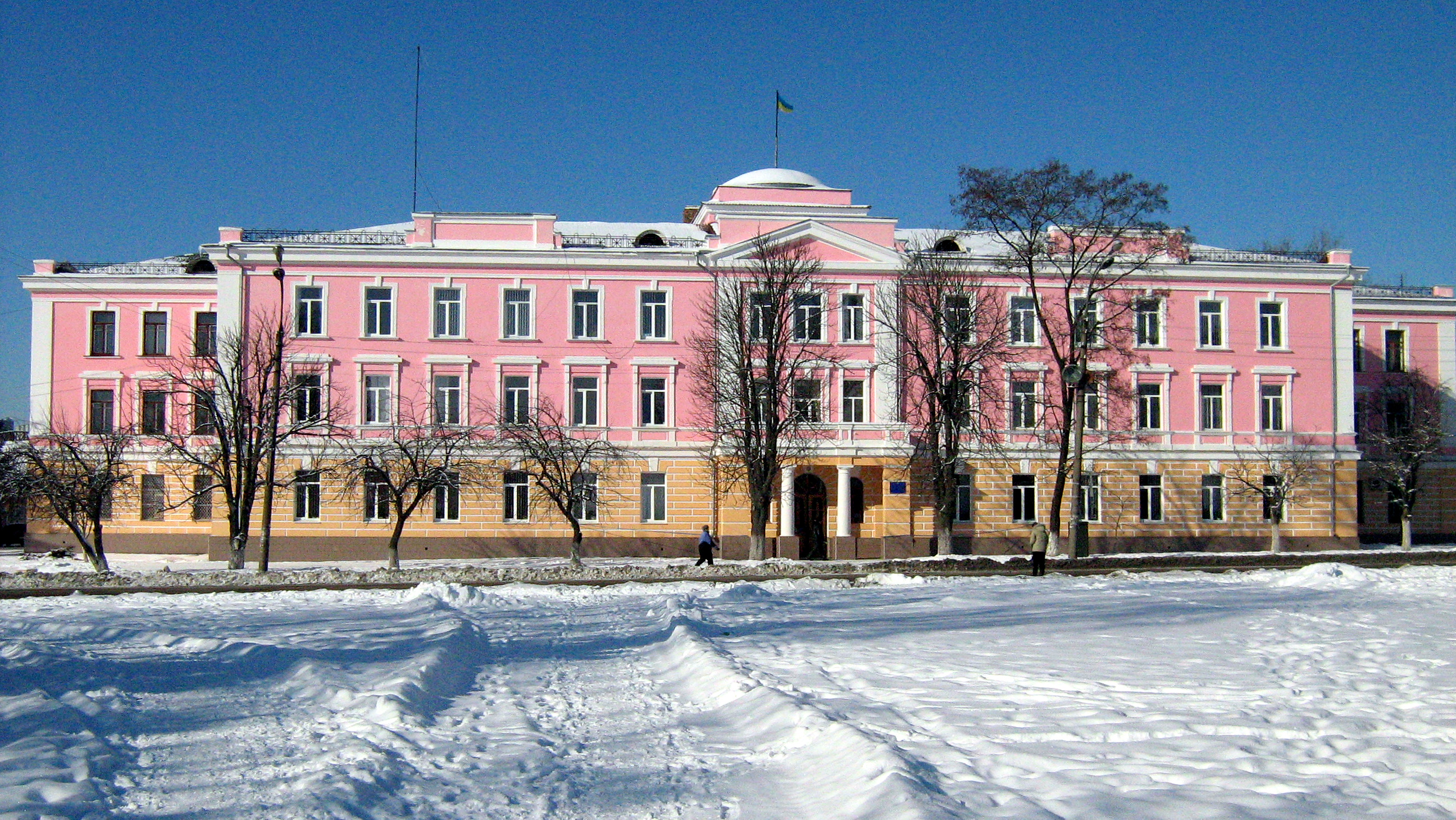
- Railway station Museum of Propaganda Shepetivka District Council

- Flag Coat of arms

- Location of Shepetivka in Ukraine Shepetivka (Ukraine)
- Coordinates: 50°11′0″N 27°04′0″E
- Country: Ukraine
- Oblast: Khmelnytskyi Oblast
- Raion: Shepetivka Raion
- Hromada: Shepetivka urban hromada
- First mentioned: 1594
- Town rights: 1619

Area
  - Total: 40 km^{2} (15 sq mi)

Population (2022)
  - Total: 40,299
  - Density: 1,199/km^{2} (3,110/sq mi)
- Postal code: 30400 - 30409
- Area code: +380 3840
- Website: shepetivka.com.ua

Shepetivka (Ukrainian: Шепетівка, IPA: [ʃepeˈt⁽ʲ⁾iu̯kɐ]; Polish: Szepetówka) is a city located on the Huska River in Khmelnytskyi Oblast (province) in western Ukraine. Shepetivka is the administrative center of Shepetivka Raion (district). It hosts the administration of Shepetivka urban hromada, one of the hromadas of Ukraine. Population: 40,299 (2022 estimate).

Shepetivka is an important railway junction with five intersecting transit routes. It is located 100 km away from Khmelnytskyi, the oblast's capital.

== History ==
Historical affiliations

Poland-Lithuania 1594–1793
Russian Empire 1793–1917
Ukrainian People's Republic 1917–1918
Ukrainian State 1918
Ukrainian People's Republic 1918–1919
Republic of Poland 1919–1920
Soviet Ukraine 1920–1922
Soviet Union 1922–1941
Nazi Germany 1941–1944
Soviet Union 1944–1991
Ukraine 1991–present

A settlement called Shepetovka, belonging to the prince Ivan Zaslavsky, was first mentioned in a written document in 1594. In the 16th century Shepetivka didn't differ from other settlements of Volhynia. The settlement had a community and a windmill. It was given Magdeburg rights at the end of the 16th century. This contributed the settlement's expansion and growing population. At the turn of the 16th and 17th centuries, the peasantry was intensively enslaved. Population of Shepetivka also suffered from frequent attacks of the Crimean Tatars. Peasants and craftsmen responded to the feudal oppression with the revolt in 1591-1593, led by Krzysztof Kosiński, and the revolt in 1594-1596, led by Severyn Nalyvaiko. When during the Ukrainian war of liberation from Poland in July 1648, peasant-Cossack regiments of Maxym Kryvonis had conquered Polonne, the inhabitants of Shepetivka joined the troops.

At the end of the 17th century, Shepetivka became property of Lubomirski family, and in 1703, of the Sanguszko family. In 1795, it became part of Iziaslav County, Volhynian Governorate. In 1866, Shepetivka became the capital of the county.

The first railway station was built in 1873.

Shepetovka was a town with extensive settlement by Jews, similar to the surrounding region. There were 20,000 Jews counted in a census in the late 1670s, and 52,000 in the 1760s. Several important rabbis were active in the region in the 1700s, including Rabbi Pinchas Shapira, who is buried in Shepetovka. Significant emigration from Shepetovka occurred between 1880 and 1925.

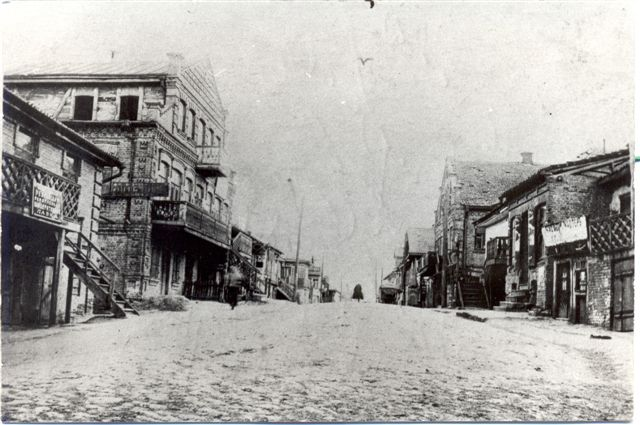
Early-20th-century photo

In 1923, it got the status of a town, becoming the capital of Shepetovka district. In 1932 it became the capital of Shepetivka Raion, Vinnytsia Oblast. In 1936, part of the Polish population was expelled by the Soviets to Kazakhstan. In 1937 Shepetivka Raion became part of Kamianets-Podilskyi (since 1954 Khmelnytskyi) Oblast.

During World War II, the town was occupied by Germany from 1941 to 1944. The Jewish population of Shepetovka was decimated. Hundreds of people were executed over the summer of 1941, and thousands more in the summer of 1942. Some Jews were evacuated to Uzbekistan and survived the war. The occupiers operated the Stalag 357 and Stalag 301 prisoner-of-war camps in the town, and briefly also the AGSSt 12 assembly center for prisoners of war.

In 1991, Ukraine became an independent state, and Shepetovka became part of the state (and the town name took on the Ukrainian variant of "Shepetivka").

Until 18 July 2020, Shepetivka was incorporated as a city of oblast significance and served as the administrative center of Shepetivka Raion though it did not belong to the raion. In July 2020, as part of the administrative reform of Ukraine, which reduced the number of raions of Khmelnytskyi Oblast to three, the city of Shepetivka was merged into Shepetivka Raion.

== Geography ==
=== Climate ===
Climate data for Shepetivka (1981–2010)
Month	Jan	Feb	Mar	Apr	May	Jun	Jul	Aug	Sep	Oct	Nov	Dec	Year
Mean daily maximum °C (°F)	−1.3 (29.7)	−0.2 (31.6)	5.0 (41.0)	13.6 (56.5)	20.1 (68.2)	22.4 (72.3)	24.3 (75.7)	23.8 (74.8)	18.4 (65.1)	12.2 (54.0)	4.6 (40.3)	−0.3 (31.5)	11.9 (53.4)
Daily mean °C (°F)	−3.8 (25.2)	−3.2 (26.2)	1.1 (34.0)	8.2 (46.8)	14.3 (57.7)	16.9 (62.4)	18.8 (65.8)	18.1 (64.6)	13.1 (55.6)	7.7 (45.9)	2.0 (35.6)	−2.5 (27.5)	7.6 (45.7)
Mean daily minimum °C (°F)	−6.4 (20.5)	−6.1 (21.0)	−2.3 (27.9)	3.5 (38.3)	8.9 (48.0)	11.9 (53.4)	13.7 (56.7)	12.9 (55.2)	8.8 (47.8)	4.3 (39.7)	−0.8 (30.6)	−5.0 (23.0)	3.6 (38.5)
Average precipitation mm (inches)	36.1 (1.42)	38.4 (1.51)	35.9 (1.41)	46.1 (1.81)	64.0 (2.52)	98.2 (3.87)	101.9 (4.01)	72.3 (2.85)	63.5 (2.50)	43.5 (1.71)	41.9 (1.65)	41.6 (1.64)	683.4 (26.91)
Average precipitation days (≥ 1.0 mm)	9.2	9.5	8.8	8.1	9.2	11.0	10.4	8.4	8.2	7.6	8.3	10.4	109.1
Average relative humidity (%)	86.6	84.8	80.3	71.1	69.0	74.3	75.8	75.2	79.3	81.9	87.2	88.3	79.5
Mean monthly sunshine hours	42.8	66.7	121.7	182.9	264.1	239.3	254.3	250.8	168.2	120.6	51.9	25.3	1,788.6
Source: World Meteorological Organization

== Demographics ==
As of the 2001 Ukrainian census, the population of Shepetivka amounted to 47,955 people, which made it the third-largest city in the entire Khmelnytskyi Oblast. In terms of ethnicities living in the city, Ukrainians accounted for 90.7% of the population, followed by a number of minorities, including ethnic Russians (5.8%), Poles (2%) and a small community of Belarusians (0.3%). The exact distribution of the population by their ethnicity as of the census was as follows:

Ethnic groups in Shepetivka
	percent
Ukrainians	90.68%
Russians	5.77%
Poles	1.97%
Belarusians	0.31%
Jews	0.26%
Gypsies	0.18%
Armenians	0.11%
others	0.72%

Distribution of the population by native languages according to the 2001 census:

Native languages in Shepetivka
	percent
Ukrainian	93.5%
Russian	5.7%
Romani	0.1%
Polish	0.1%
Belarusian	0.1%
Armenian	0.1%
others	0.4%

== Local media ==
There are several media types represented in Shepetivka:

- newspapers
  - Shepetivskyi Visnyk is a city district publication (founders - Shepetivka city and district councils, RSA, the editorial staff of the newspaper); circulation is up to 7800 copies per week; comes out twice a week
  - Den za dnem is a regional information-analytical weekly; weekly circulation — 7600 copies
- TV
  - TV and Radio Company LLC Like TV (former Chance)
- radio
  - editorial office of the city district radio broadcasting

== Notable people ==
- Oleksii Mes, Ukrainian Air Force pilot, who died while intercepting Russian cruise missiles, was born in Shepetivka
- Valentina Matviyenko, Chairwoman of the Federation Council of Russia, former governor of Saint Petersburg, was born in Shepetivka
- Ignacy Jan Paderewski, pianist, composer, and Polish prime minister, lived near Shepetivka as a child
- Nikolai Ostrovsky, Soviet writer, the author How the Steel Was Tempered, lived here during his childhood and adolescent years
- Rabbis Pinchas of Korets lived about 30 miles from Shepetivka, but died and is buried in Shepetivka.
- Rabbi Simcha Sheps, Rosh Yeshiva of Yeshiva Torah Vodaas grew up in Shepetivka (according to the Torah Vodaas Haggadah)
- Serhiy Klimovych, Hero of Soviet Union, was born and died in Shepetivka
- Valentin Kotyk, the youngest-ever Hero of Soviet Union.
- Aizik Vaiman, notable orientalist.

== Gallery ==
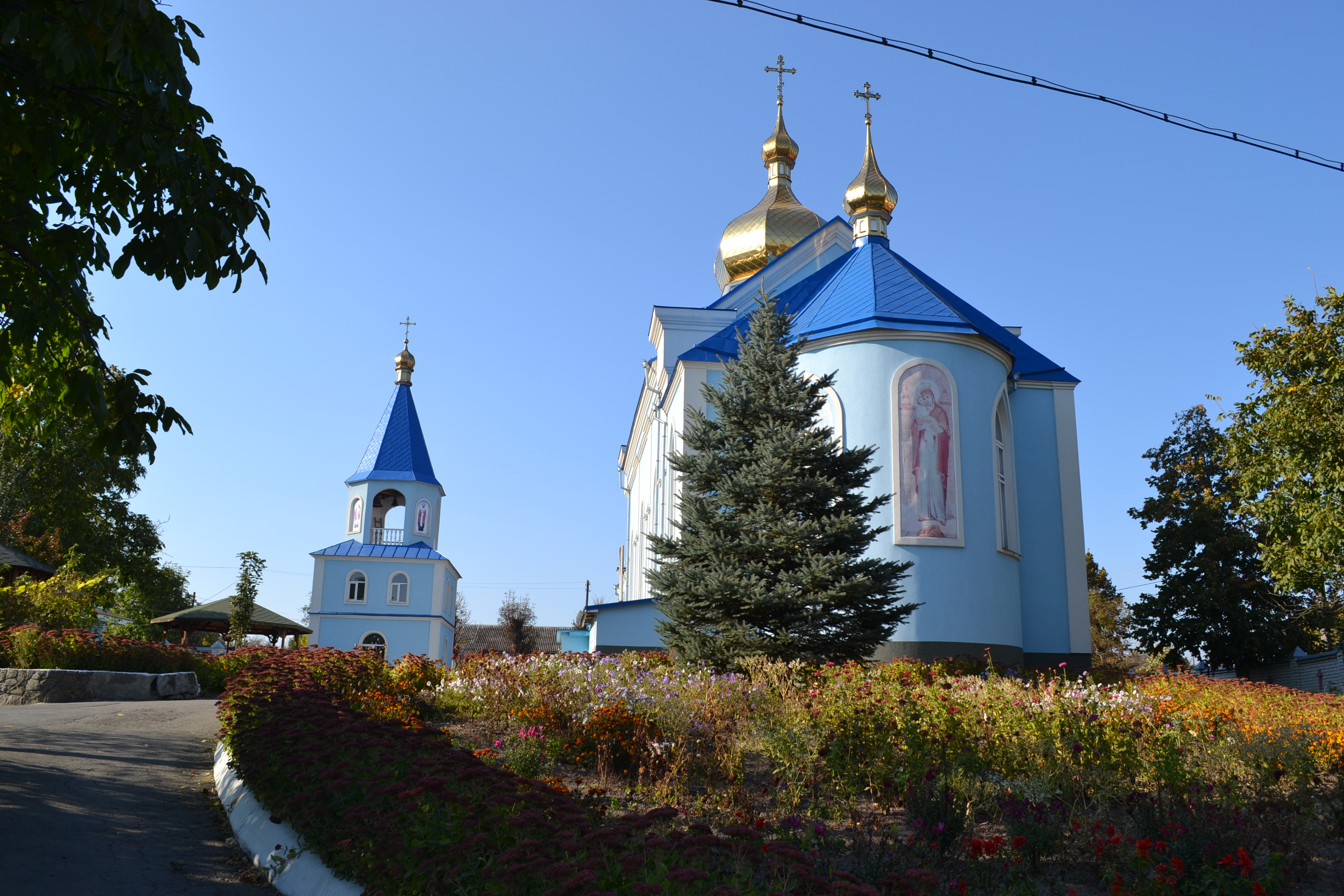
Church of Nativity

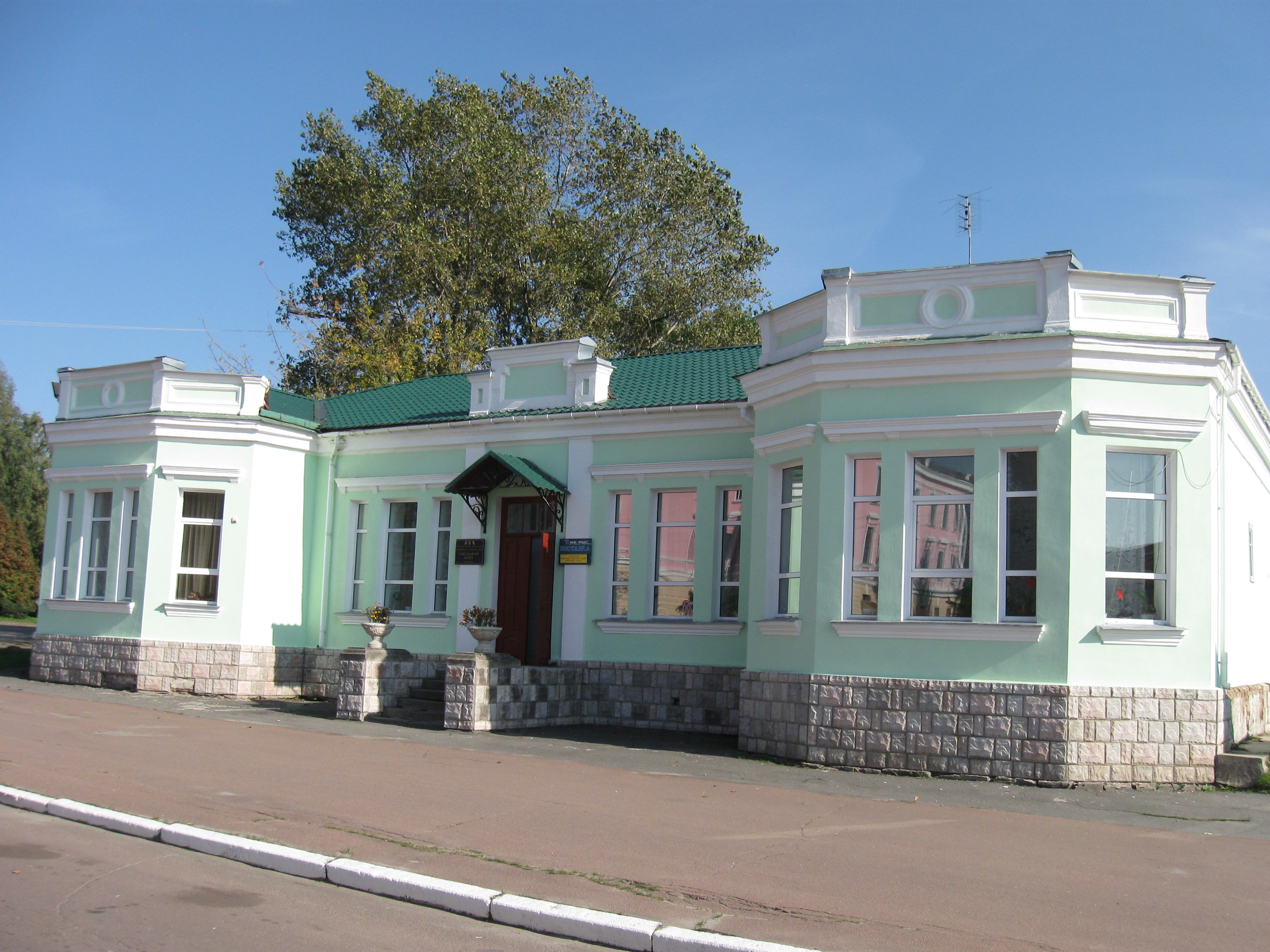
Museum

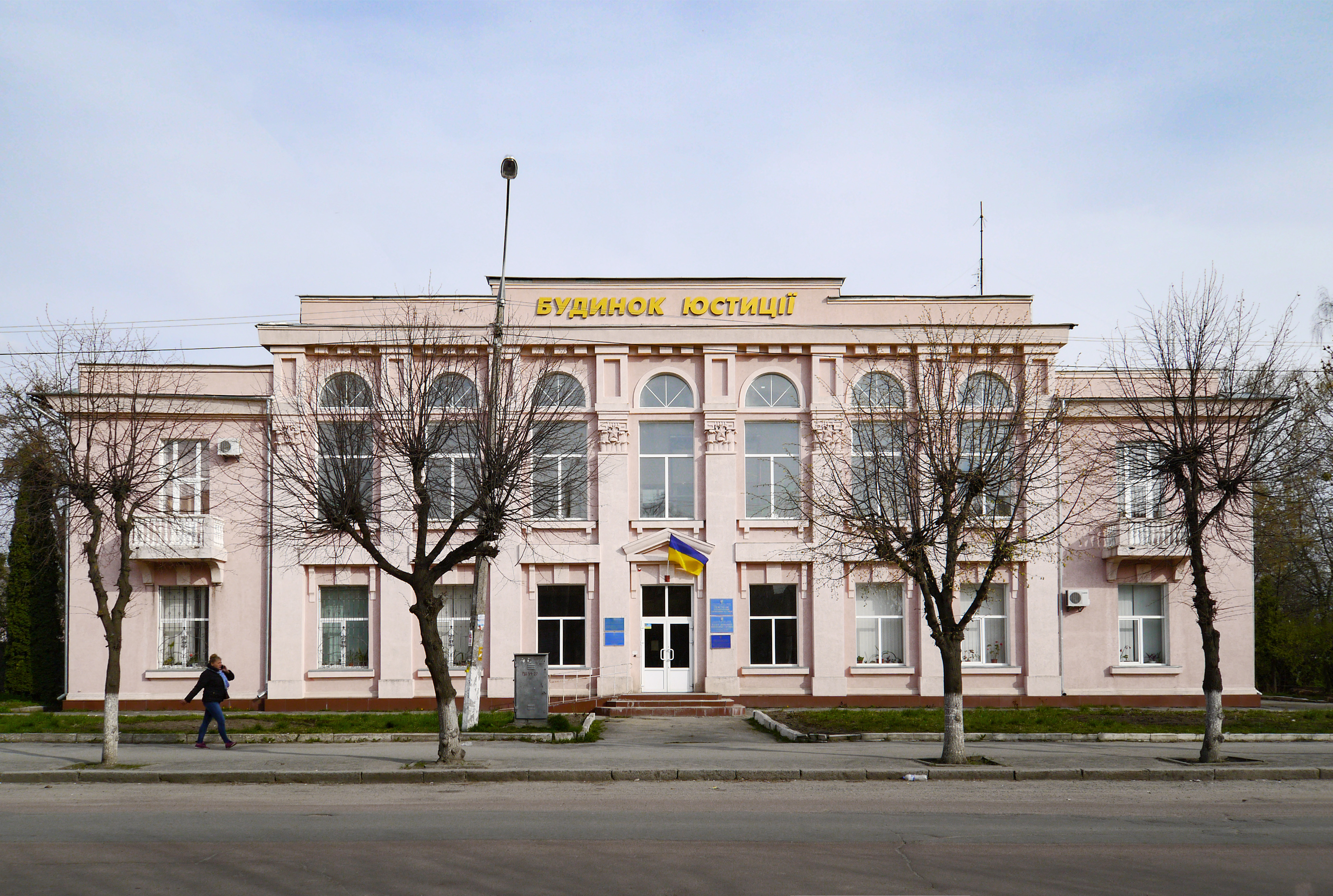
Palace of Justice

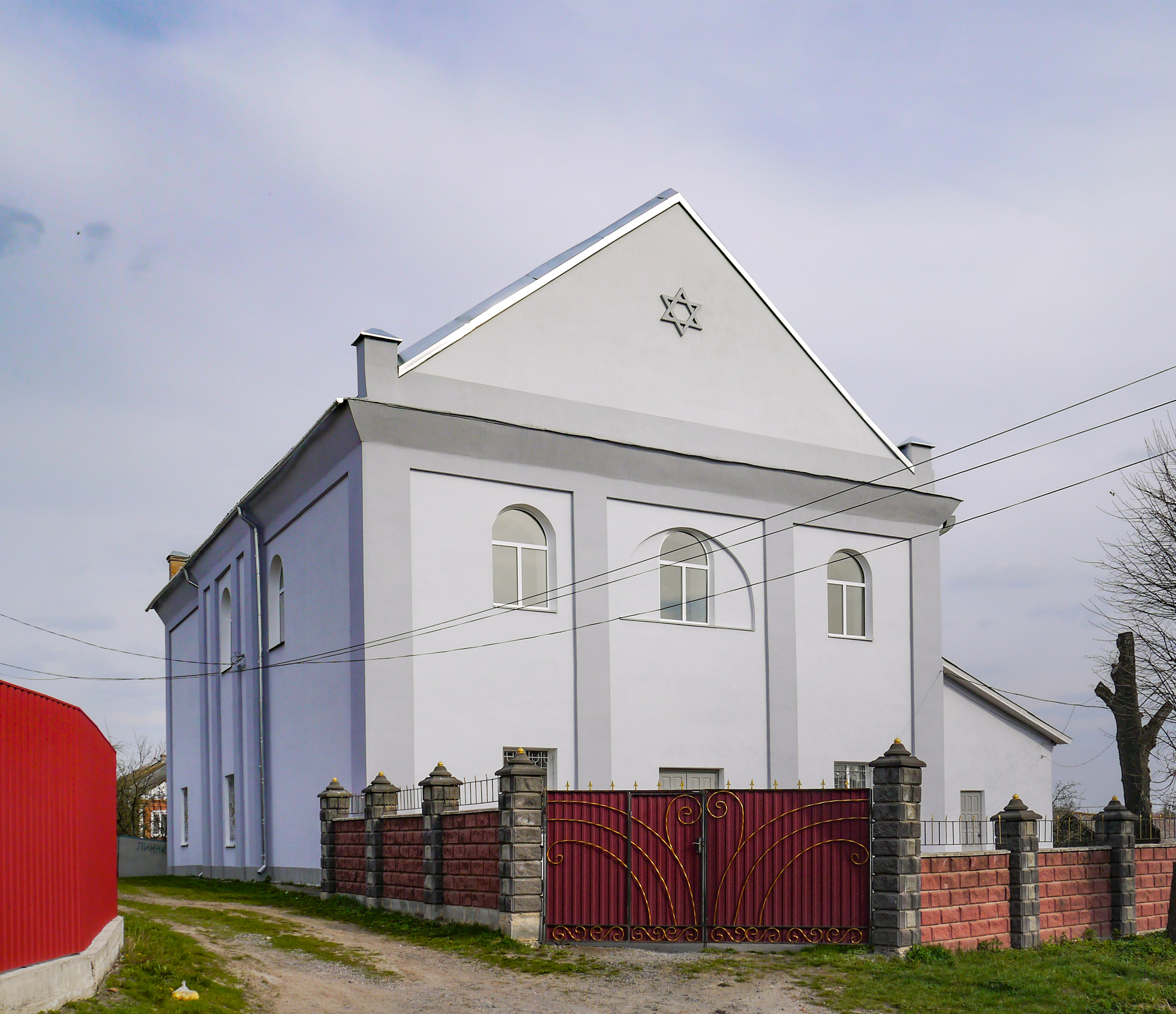
Great Synagogue

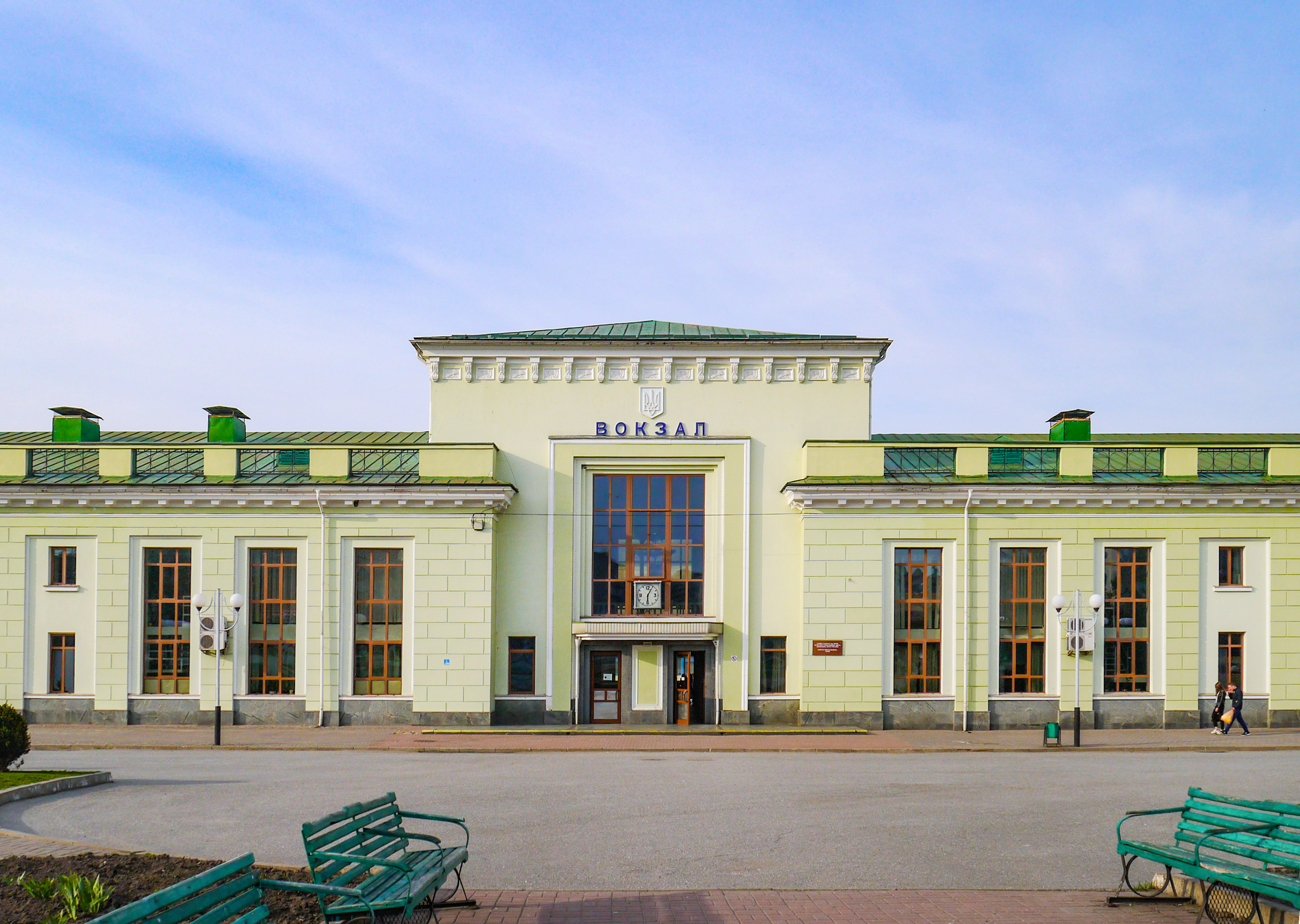
Railway Station

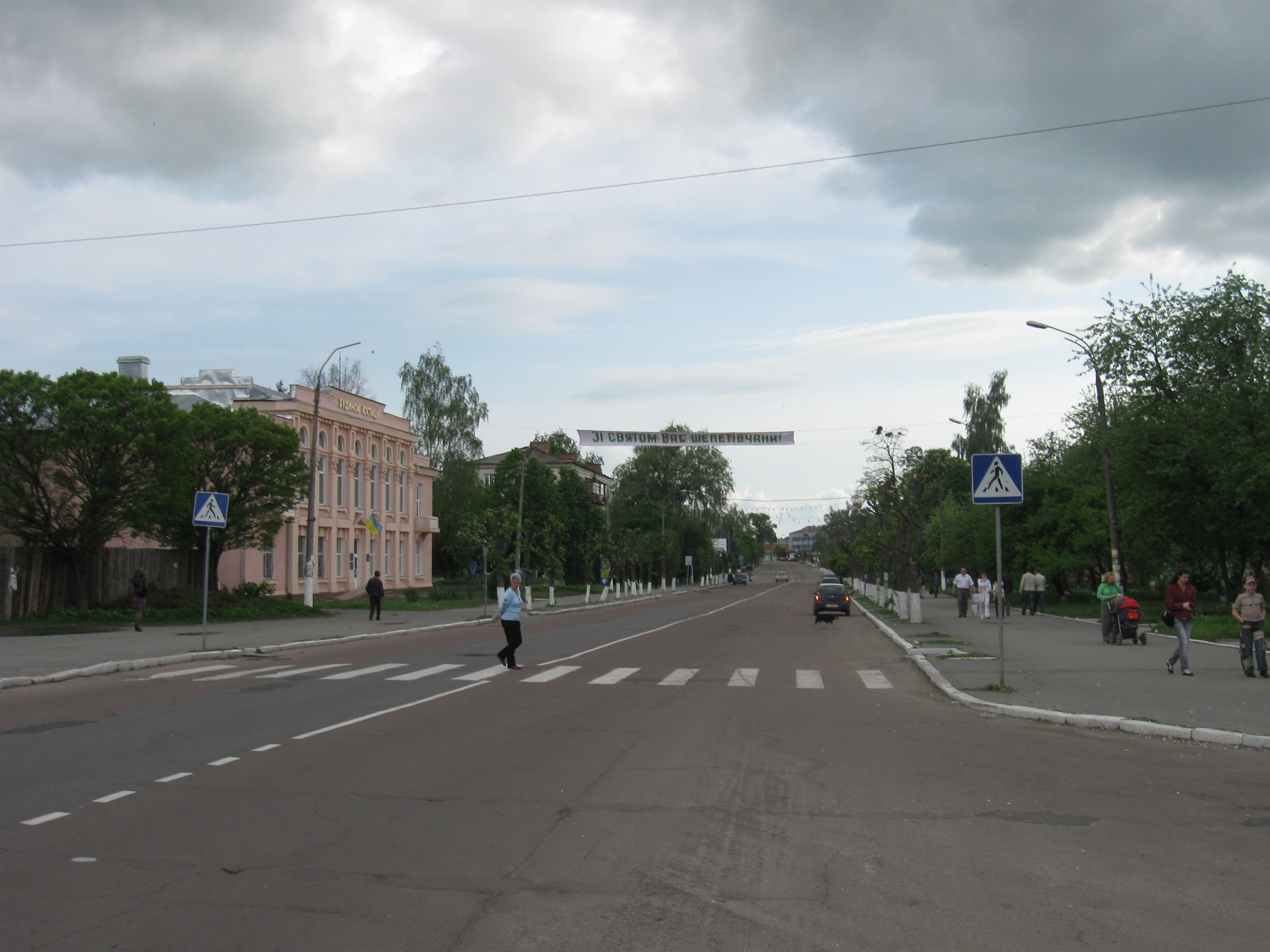
Heroiv Nebesnoi Sotni Street

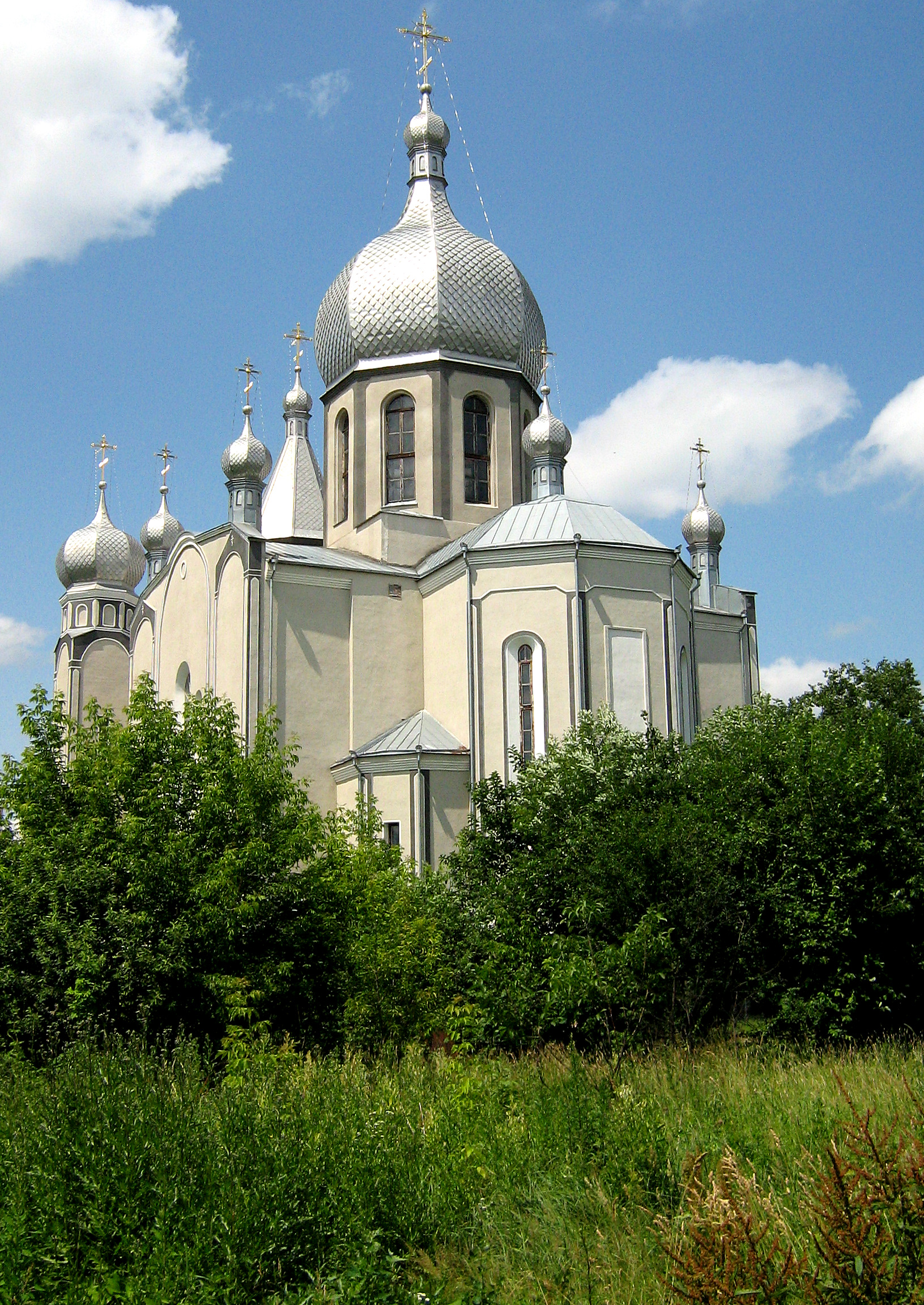
Saint Michael's Church

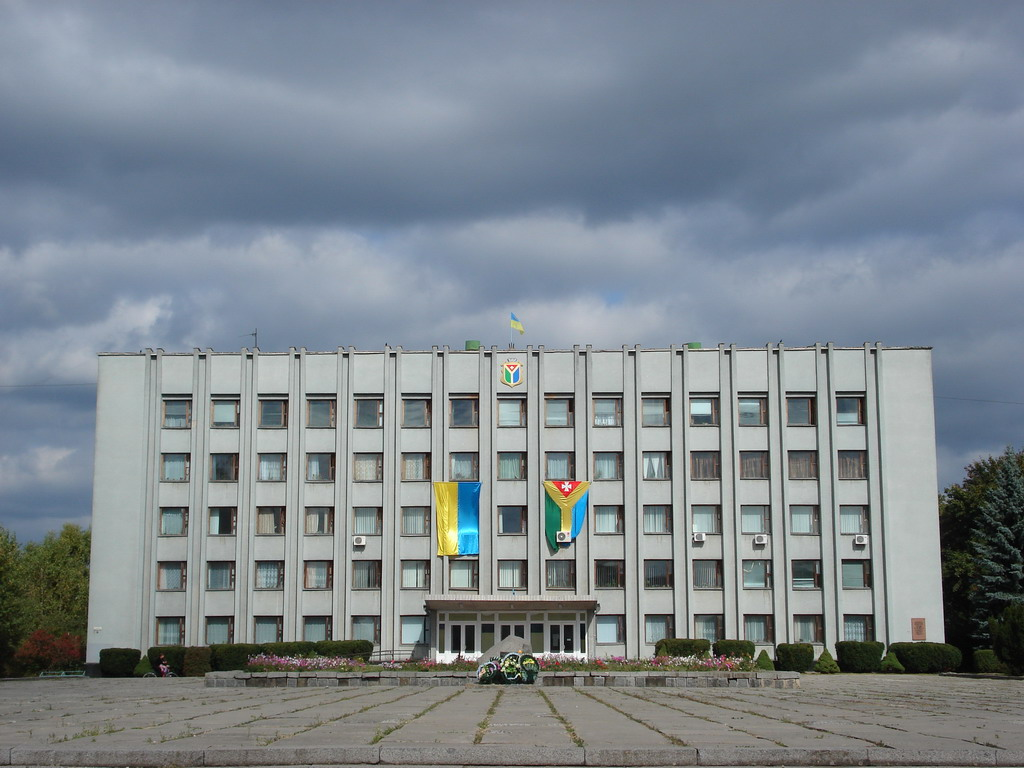
City Hall

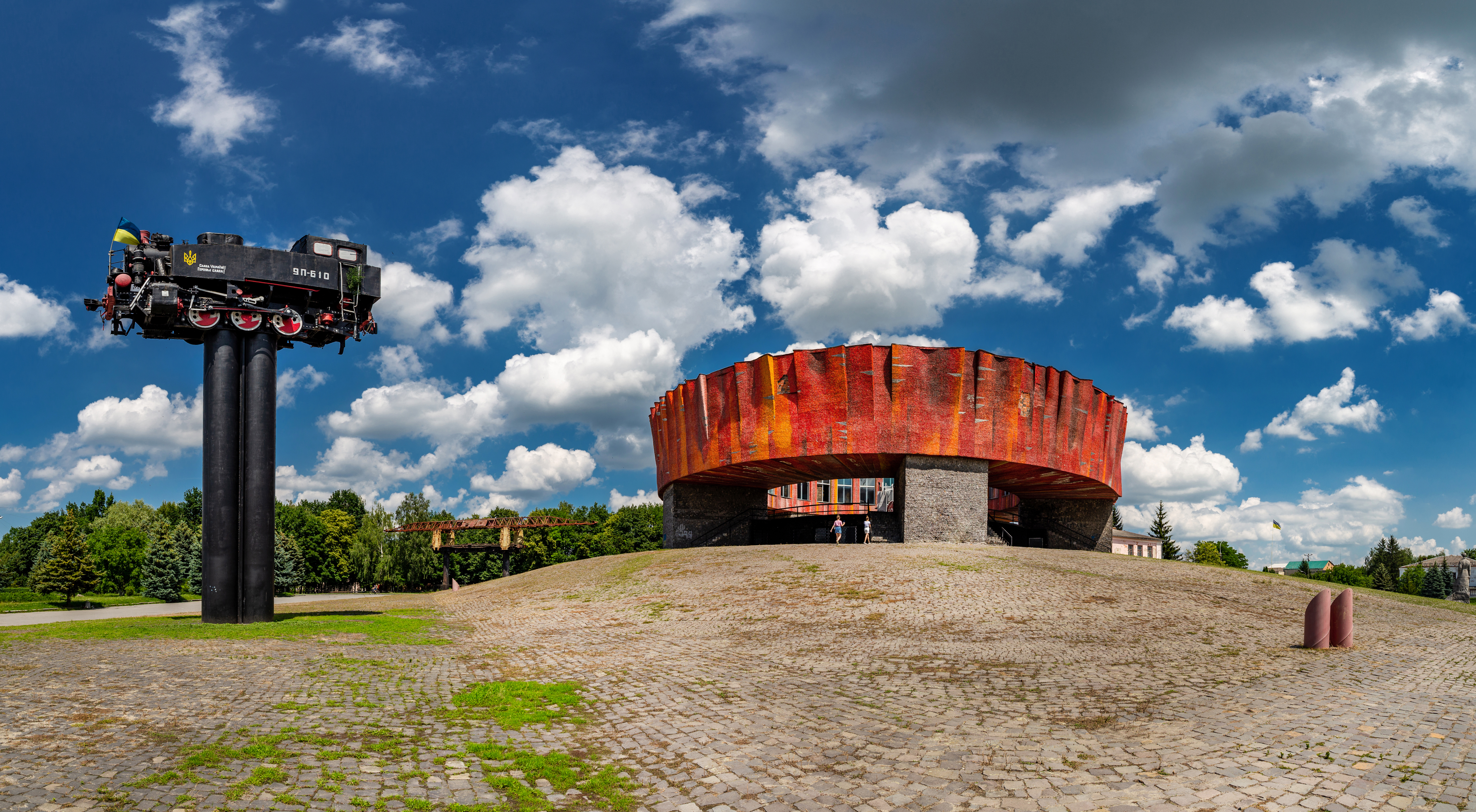
Museum of Propaganda
