= Bilohiria Raion =

Former subdivision of Khmelnytskyi Oblast, Ukraine

Bilohiria Raion Білогірський район
- Raion
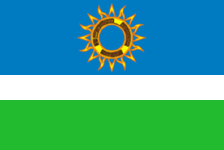
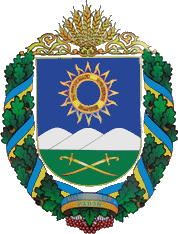
- Flag Coat of arms

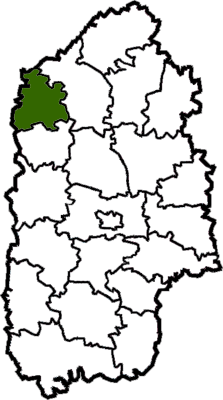
- Coordinates: 50°02′25″N 26°22′22″E
- Country: Ukraine
- Region: Khmelnytskyi Oblast
- Established: 7 March 1923
- Disestablished: 18 July 2020
- Admin. center: Bilohirya
- Subdivisions: List: 0 — city councils; 2 — settlement councils; 23 — rural councils; Number of localities: 0 — cities; 2 — urban-type settlements; 72 — villages; 0 — rural settlements

Government
  - Governor: Ludmyla V. Yanyshyna

Area
  - Total: 776.3 km^{2} (299.7 sq mi)

Population (2020)
  - Total: 25,403
  - Density: 32.72/km^{2} (84.75/sq mi)
- Time zone: UTC+02:00 (EET)
  - Summer (DST): UTC+03:00 (EEST)
- Postal index: 30200—30245
- Area code: 380-3841
- Website: bil-rada.at.ua

Bilohiria Raion (Ukrainian: Білогірський район) was a raion in Khmelnytskyi Oblast in Ukraine. Its administrative center was the urban-type settlement of Bilohiria. It was established in 1923. 2 urban-type settlements and 72 villages were located in Bilohiria Raion. The raion was abolished on 18 July 2020 as part of the administrative reform of Ukraine, which reduced the number of raions of Khmelnytskyi Oblast to three. The area of Bilohiria Raion was merged into Shepetivka Raion. The last estimate of the raion population was 25,403 (2020 est.)

== Geography ==
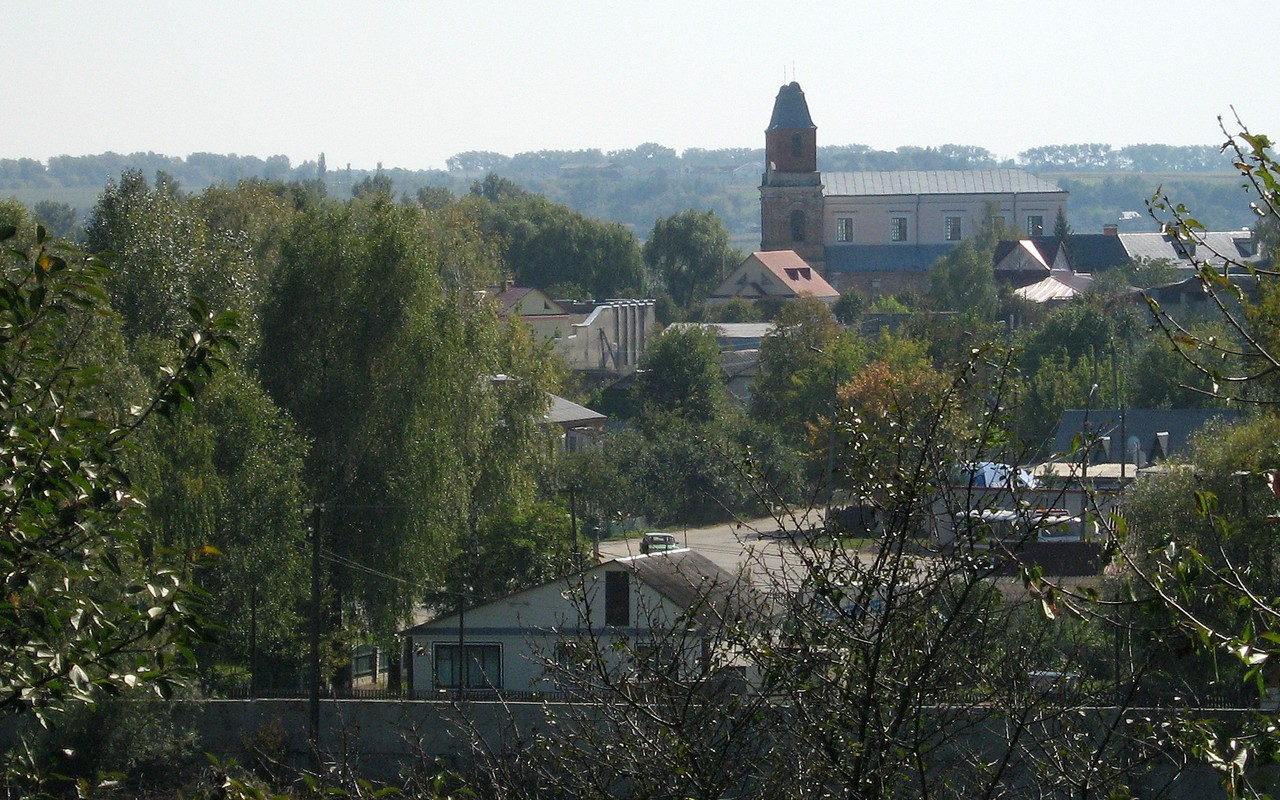
View of Bilohirya.

Bilohiria Raion was a part of Volhynia. Before 2020, it was one out 20 Raions of Khmelnytskyi Oblast. This was a small raion which occupied the 17th place among the districts of the region (776.3 km² corresponds to 3.8% of the total area Khmelnytskyi Oblast).

Bilohiria Raion was south of Rivne Oblast (Ostroh Raion), southwest of Iziaslav Raion, north of Teofipol Raion, and east of Ternopil Oblast (Lanivtsi Raion and Shumsk Raion). The Horyn, Vilia, Poltva and other rivers flowed through the district. There was a rail line through the district (Shepetivka—Ternopil).

== Subdivisions ==
At the time of disestablishment, the raion consisted of two hromadas:

- Bilohiria settlement hromada with the administration in Bilohiria;
- Yampil settlement hromada with the administration in the urban-type settlement of Yampil.

== History ==
The raion (district) was created on 7 March 1923 as Lyakhivtsi Raion within Shepetivka Okruha, Volhynia Governorate. In 1925 all governorates of Ukraine were liquidated.

From 1923 to 1930 the district was part of the Shepetivka Okruha (see Okruhas of Ukraine). In 1930 all okruhas of Ukraine were liquidated. In 1932 it was included to the newly formed Vinnytsia Oblast. In 1935-37 Lyakhivtsi Raion was part of the Soviet Shepetivka border okrug (still part of Vinnytsia Oblast), which was part of border okrug system that stretched along the western border of the Soviet Union.

In 1937 Kamianets-Podilskyi Oblast was created based on three border okrugs (Kamianets-Podilskyi, Proskuriv, and Shepetivka). Lyakhivtsi Raion became a part of the newly formed oblast. During the World War II, raion was occupied by the Nazi Germany in 1941-1944 and was dissolved, while its territory was part of the Wolhynien und Podolien General bezirk. Following the war, Kamianets-Podilskyi Oblast was revived, while in 1946 Lyakhivtsi were renamed to Bilohiria, while Lyakhivtsi Raion became Bilohiria Raion. In 1954 the administrative center was moved from Kamianets-Podilskyi to Khemlnytskyi (before 1954 Proskuriv) and the oblast was renamed as Khmelnytskyi Oblast. Finally Bilohiria Raion was formed September 23, 1959.
