= Iziaslav Raion =

Former subdivision of Khmelnytskyi Oblast, Ukraine

Iziaslav Raion Ізяславський район
- Raion
- Flag Coat of arms

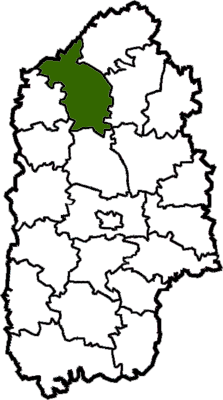
- Coordinates: 50°06′11″N 26°43′25″E
- Country: Ukraine
- Region: Khmelnytskyi Oblast
- Established: 7 March 1923
- Disestablished: 18 July 2020
- Admin. center: Iziaslav
- Subdivisions: List: 1 — city councils; 0 — settlement councils; 29 — rural councils; Number of localities: 1 — cities; 0 — urban-type settlements; 91 — villages; 0 — rural settlements

Government
  - Governor: Mihail S. Borisyuk

Area
  - Total: 1,250 km^{2} (480 sq mi)

Population (2020)
  - Total: 41,972
  - Density: 33.6/km^{2} (87.0/sq mi)
- Time zone: UTC+02:00 (EET)
  - Summer (DST): UTC+03:00 (EEST)
- Postal index: 30300—30375
- Area code: 380-3852
- Website: izadm.km.ua

Iziaslav Raion (Ukrainian: Ізяславський район) was a raion in Khmelnytskyi Oblast in Ukraine. Its administrative center was the city of Iziaslav. It was established in 1923. One city and ninety-one villages were located in Iziaslav Raion. The raion was abolished on 18 July 2020 as part of the administrative reform of Ukraine, which reduced the number of raions of Khmelnytskyi Oblast to three. The area of Iziaslav Raion was merged into Shepetivka Raion. The last estimate of the raion population was 41,972 (2020 est.)

== Geography ==
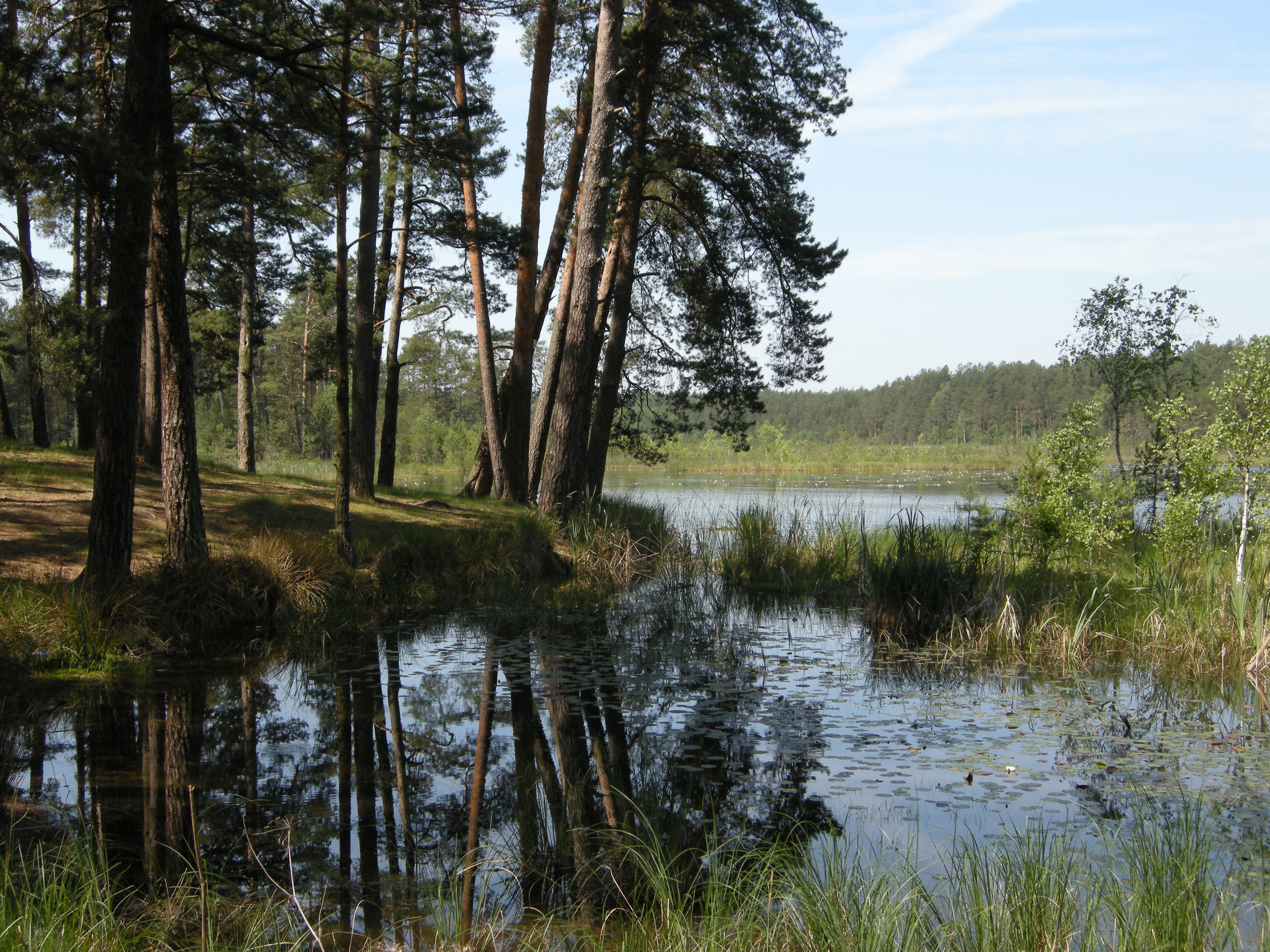
Sviate Lake

Iziaslav Raion was a part of Volhynia. It was one out 20 raions of Khmelnytskyi Oblast. It was a large raion and ranked as the 2nd among the largest with respect to the total area (1,258 km^{2} corresponding to 6.1% of the total area of Khmelnytskyi Oblast).

Iziaslav Raion was southwest of Rivne Oblast (Ostroh Raion), northeast of Slavuta Raion, west of Shepetivka Raion, north of Krasyliv Raion, and northeast of Teofipol Raion and Bilohiria Raion. The Horyn, Vilia, Homora, Hnylyi Rig and other rivers flowed through the district. There were rail lines through the district (Shepetivka—Ternopil and Shepetivka—Starokostiantyniv).

== Subdivisions ==
At the time of disestablishment, the raion consisted of three hromadas:

- Iziaslav urban hromada with the administration in Iziaslav;
- Pluzhne rural hromada with the administration in the selo of Pluzhne;
- Sakhnivtsi rural hromada with the administration in the selo of Sakhnivtsi.

== History ==
From 1923 to 1932 the district was part of the Shepetivka region, then from 1932 to 1937 it was part of the Vinnytsia region. Following that from 1937 to 1954 it was part of the Kamenets Podolsk region. Since 1954 it has been part of the Khmelnytskyi region. Finally Iziaslav Raion was formed September 23, 1959.
