= Antonivka =

Places with the same name

Antonivka (Ukrainian: Антонівка) can refer to any of several places in Ukraine:

== Rural settlements ==
=== Kherson Oblast ===
- Antonivka, Kherson Raion
- Antonivka, Skadovsk Raion

== Villages ==
=== Autonomous Republic of Crimea ===
- Antonivka, Dzhankoi Raion

=== Cherkasy Oblast ===
- Antonivka, Lypianka rural hromada
- Antonivka, Talne urban hromada
- Antonivka, Uman Raion

=== Chernihiv Oblast ===
- Antonivka, Chernihiv Oblast

=== Dnipropetrovsk Oblast ===
- Antonivka, Dnipropetrovsk Oblast

=== Donetsk Oblast ===
- Antonivka, Donetsk Oblast

=== Ivano-Frankivsk Oblast ===
- Antonivka, Ivano-Frankivsk Oblast

=== Kharkiv Oblast ===
- Antonivka, Berestyn Raion

=== Kherson Oblast ===
- Antonivka, Kakhovka Raion

=== Khmelnytskyi Oblast ===
- Antonivka, Chemerivtsi settlement hromada
- Antonivka, Chornyi Ostriv settlement hromada
- Antonivka, Dunaivtsi urban hromada
- Antonivka, Letychiv settlement hromada
- Antonivka, Nova Ushytsia settlement hromada
- Antonivka, Pluzhne hromada, Shepetivka Raion
- Antonivka, Teofipol settlement hromada

=== Kirovohrad Oblast ===
- Antonivka, Dolynska urban hromada
- Antonivka, Kompaniivka settlement hromada
- Antonivka, Oleksandrivka settlement hromada

=== Kyiv Oblast ===
- Antonivka, Obukhiv Raion
- Antonivka, Stavyshche settlement hromada
- Antonivka, Tarashcha urban hromada

=== Luhansk Oblast ===
- Antonivka, Luhansk Oblast

=== Lviv Oblast ===
- Antonivka, Lviv Oblast

=== Mykolaiv Oblast ===
- Antonivka, Bashtanka Raion
- Antonivka, Domanivka settlement hromada
- Antonivka, Mykolaiv Raion
- Antonivka, Novomaryivka rural hromada

=== Odesa Oblast ===
- Antonivka, Berezivka Raion
- Antonivka, Liubashivka settlement hromada
- Antonivka, Okny settlement hromada
- Antonivka, Rozdilna Raion

=== Rivne Oblast ===
- Antonivka, Rivne Raion
- Antonivka, Varash Raion

=== Sumy Oblast ===
- Antonivka, Konotop Raion
- Antonivka, Shostka Raion

=== Vinnytsia Oblast ===
- Antonivka, Haisyn Raion
- Antonivka, Tulchyn Raion
- Antonivka, Vinnytsia Raion
- Antonivka, Zhmerynka Raion

=== Volyn Oblast ===
- Antonivka, Berestechko urban hromada, Lutsk Raion
- Antonivka, Lutsk urban hromada, Lutsk Raion

=== Zhytomyr Oblast ===
- Antonivka, Zhytomyr Raion
- Antonivka, Zviahel Raion

=== Zaporizhzhia Oblast ===
- Antonivka, Polohy Raion
- Antonivka, Zaporizhzhia Raion

== See also ==
- Mala Antonivka, Bila Tserkva Raion
- Antonivka Bridge (disambiguation)
- Antonovca (disambiguation)
