= Bilohiria =

Rural locality in Khmelnytskyi Oblast, Ukraine

Bilohiria Білогір'я
- Rural settlement
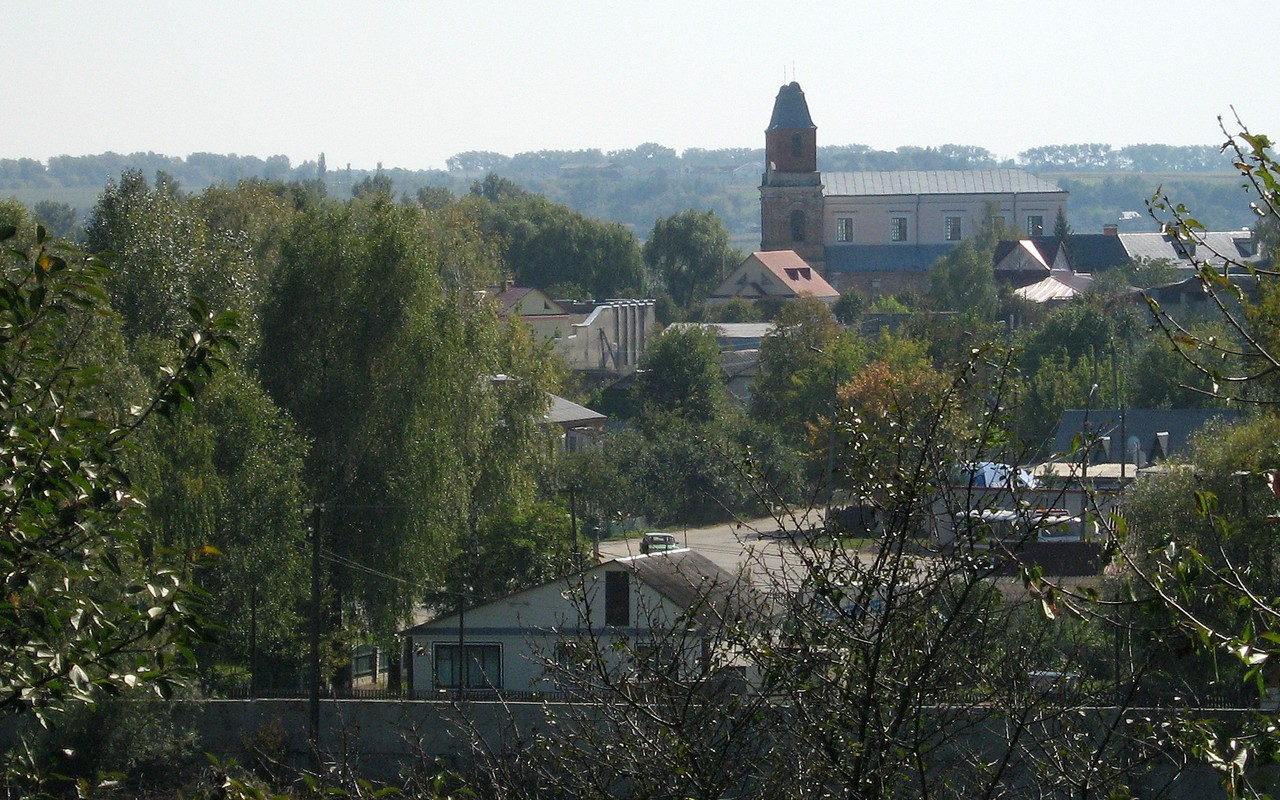
- View of Bilohiria with the Dominican Cathedral in the background (ca. 17th century).

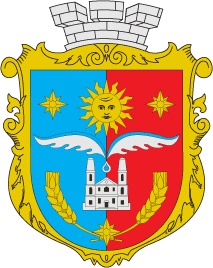
- Coat of arms

- Location of Bilohiria Bilohiria (Khmelnytskyi Oblast)
- Coordinates: 50°00′18″N 26°24′57″E
- Country: Ukraine
- Oblast: Khmelnytskyi Oblast
- Raion: Shepetivka Raion
- Hromada: Bilohiria settlement hromada
- Founded: 1441
- Town status: 1960

Area
  - Total: 8.6 km^{2} (3.3 sq mi)
- Elevation: 236 m (774 ft)

Population (2022)
  - Total: 5,089 ▼
  - Density: 590/km^{2} (1,500/sq mi)
- Time zone: UTC+2 (EET)
  - Summer (DST): UTC+3 (EEST)
- Postal code: 30200
- Area code: +380 3841
- Website: http://rada.gov.ua/

Bilohiria (Ukrainian: Білогір'я) is a rural settlement in Shepetivka Raion, Khmelnytskyi Oblast, western Ukraine. It hosts the administration of Bilohiria settlement hromada, one of the hromadas of Ukraine. The settlement's population was 5,592 as of the 2001 Ukrainian Census and 5,089 (2022 estimate). Nearby urban localities include Yampil (formerly Yampol or Iampol), Kremenets, and Kornytsya.

The town is located on the banks of the Horyn River, a tributary of the Pripyat. The town of Bilohiria also administers the Bilohiria Settlement Council (Ukrainian: Білогірська селищна рада), whose jurisdiction also covers the villages of Karasykha and Trostianka.

== Name ==
The town was known by the name of Liakhivtsi (Lechowitz, Lyakhovtsy, Lechevitz, Lakhovce, Łachowce, Liakhovitz, etc.) until it was changed in 1949 when its status was upgraded to that of a rural settlement. The Yiddish version of the town name was לעחיוויץ. The Russian version of the modern name is Belogor'ye (Russian: Белогорье).

There are other towns with phonetically similar names, including one called Lyakhavichy in Belarus, a town called Lachowice in Poland, and one called Lechotice in the Czech Republic.

== History ==
=== Medieval and early modern period ===
The region surrounding Liakhivtsi was known to be settled by at least the 12th century, when residents of the Kyiv area migrated west to Volhynia and beyond. The Mongol invasion of 1260 subjected the area to rule of the Mongol khan. Lithuanian control over the region took place in the 14th century. The settlement of Liakhivtsi (Ukrainian: Ляхівці; Polish: Lachowce) was founded in 1441 on Bilohiria's modern-day territory. Jews were expelled from the region in 1495, but were allowed to return a few years later. The settlement received the Magdeburg rights in 1583.

Between the 16th and 18th centuries the village was a centre of Socinianism. Remains of a castle fortification from that period have been preserved to this day.

Polish influence increased over the 15th and 16th centuries, with Poland taking official control in 1569 with the Treaty of Lublin. Cultural life in Volhynia flourished under Polish rule, interrupted by the 1648 Chmielnicki Khmelnytsky Uprising massacres, which killed many Jewish residents. Additional settlements formed in the 1660s.

=== 19th century ===
Volhynia was transferred to Russian control in 1793, where it remained until the interwar period.

In 1885, Liakhivtsi was the administrative center of the Liakhivtsi volost of the Ostroh povit. During that time, the settlement's population consisted of 2,368.

The Russian Empire Census of 1897 reported the town's population as 5,401. At that time, 3,890 of the inhabitants belonged to the Eastern Orthodox faith, while 1,384 were of the Jewish faith.

=== 20th century ===
In the 20th century, the region was populated by both ethnic Ukrainians and Poles, whose populations struggled against each other. At the same time, Germany and the Soviet Union that were struggling for influence in the greater region. World War II brought these conflicts to the forefront. Nazi Germany occupied the region in June 1941. World War II ended in tragedy for the Jews of Lechowitz. German forces invaded Russia in June 1941, and within a year, murdered virtually the entire Jewish population of Lechowitz. A memorial exists today in the forests outside of town, where 2,300 Jews from Lechowitz and nearby towns were murdered by German forces. A small number of Jews from Lechowitz survived World War II.

The entire region fell under Soviet rule following the end of World War II. In 1960, Bilohiria received the status of an urban-type settlement. Bilohiria became part of independent Ukraine after the state declared independence in August 1991.

=== Modern time ===
Until 18 July 2020, Bilohiria was the administrative center of Bilohiria Raion. The raion was abolished in July 2020 as part of the administrative reform of Ukraine, which reduced the number of raions of Khmelnytskyi Oblast to three. The area of Bilohiria Raion was merged into Shepetivka Raion.

Until 26 January 2024, Bilohiria was designated urban-type settlement. On this day, a new law entered into force which abolished this status, and Bilohiria became a rural settlement.

== See also ==
- Yampil, the other urban-type settlement in the Bilohiria Raion
