= Stolin =

Town in Brest Region, Belarus

Stolin Столін (Belarusian) Столин (Russian)
- Town
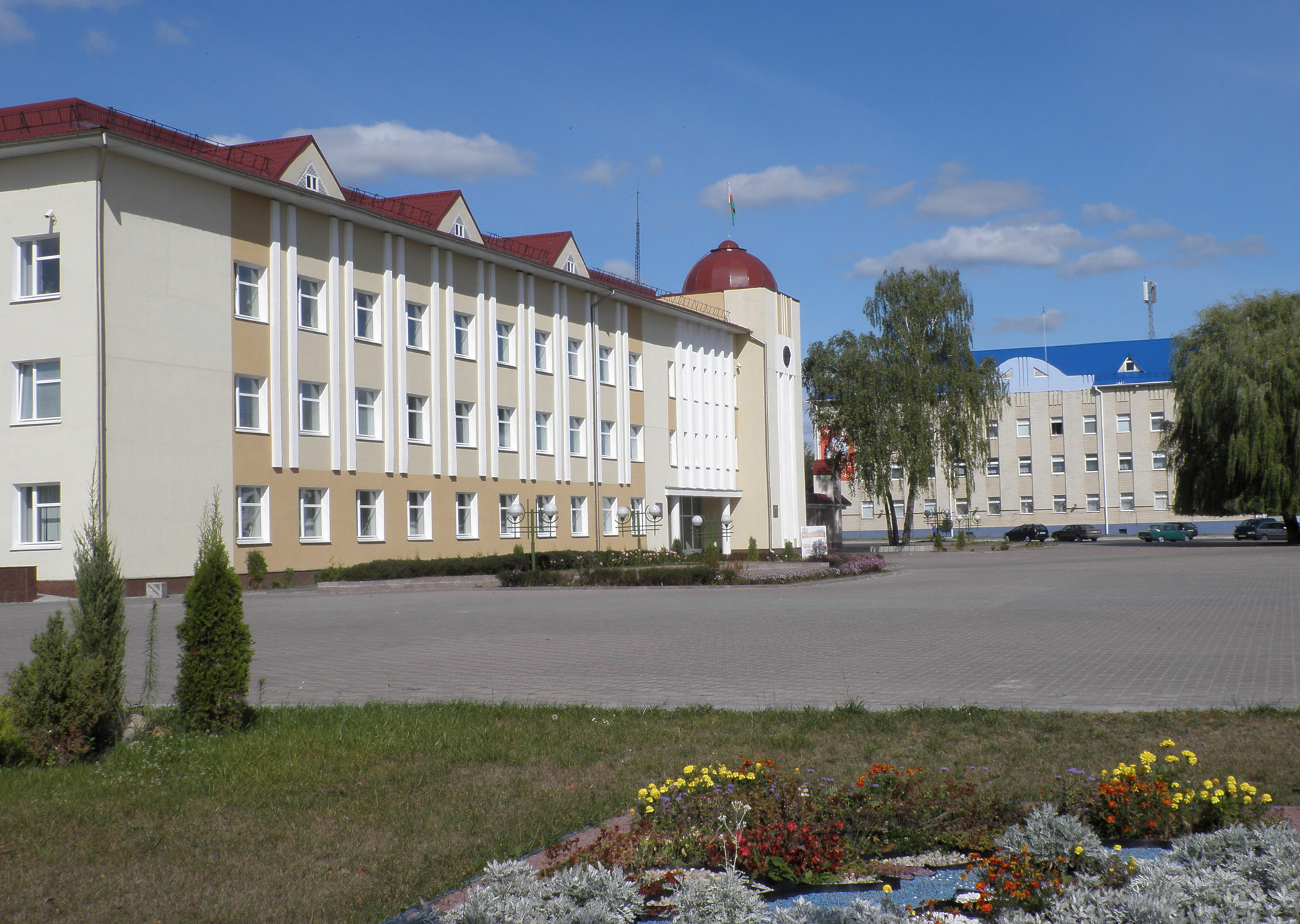

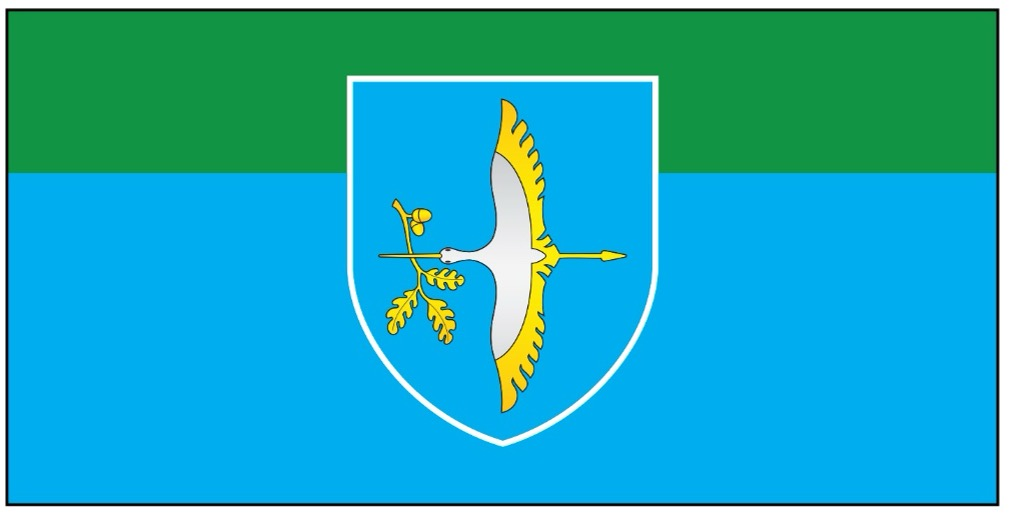
- Flag Coat of arms

- Location within Belarus
- Coordinates: 51°53′N 26°51′E
- Country: Belarus
- Region: Brest Region
- District: Stolin District
- First mentioned: 1555

Population (2025)
  - Total: 14,034
- Time zone: UTC+3 (MSK)
- Postal code: 225501
- Area code: +375 1655
- License plate: 1

Stolin (Note: Belarusian: Столін, Belarusian pronunciation: [ˈstɔlʲin]; Russian: Столин; Ukrainian: Столин, Ukrainian pronunciation: [ˈstɔlɪn]; Polish: Stolin; Yiddish: סטולין.) is a town in Brest Region, Belarus. It serves as the administrative center of Stolin District, the largest district in the region. Stolin is located 15 km (9 mi) from the Belarus–Ukraine border. As of 2025, it has a population of 14,034.

Stolin is a border city that hosts many Ukrainians on market days. Russian is spoken commonly here, but villagers prefer their own dialects that are akin partly to the Belarusian language, partly the Ukrainian language.

== History ==
Stolin is located at the heart of the Polesia region on the Horyn River, at the crossroads of two important routes, one leading northwards to Pinsk, two others eastwards to Davyd-Haradok and Turov, that are now in Belarus, southwards to Sarny and Kyiv, that are now in Ukraine.

Archaeological evidence suggests that the area which Stolin now occupies, was settled as far back as the 12th century AD. The first mention of Stolin dates to 1555. There are three stories regarding the origins of the name "Stolin". The first refers to a group of local fisherman who cast their fishing nets into a lake a pulled out 100 fish or Sto [100 in Russian] "Leeni" [a type of local fish]. The second story refers to a ferry-boat which sunk in the river and required 100 men with 100 ropes to drag it out [100 lines in Russian]. The third refers to twelve brothers who ruled over seven nearby cities and chose what became Stolin as their meeting place and capital city, hence the name may be a derivation of stol (table)> Stolny Gorod (capital city).

Stolin was occupied by the Germans from July 1941 to 1944. In August 1941, many Jewish refugees – especially women and children – from the nearby town of David-Gorodok came to Stolin. A ghetto was created in May 1942, surrounded by a barbed-wire fence. About 7,000 Jews lived in this small and unhealthy area, along the Bank River. The liquidation of the ghetto was conducted on September 11, 1942, by a squadron of German cavalry, the local police and the SD. The shooting took place near the airfield, in a large ditch.

== International relations ==
Stolin is twinned with:

- Homberg, Germany

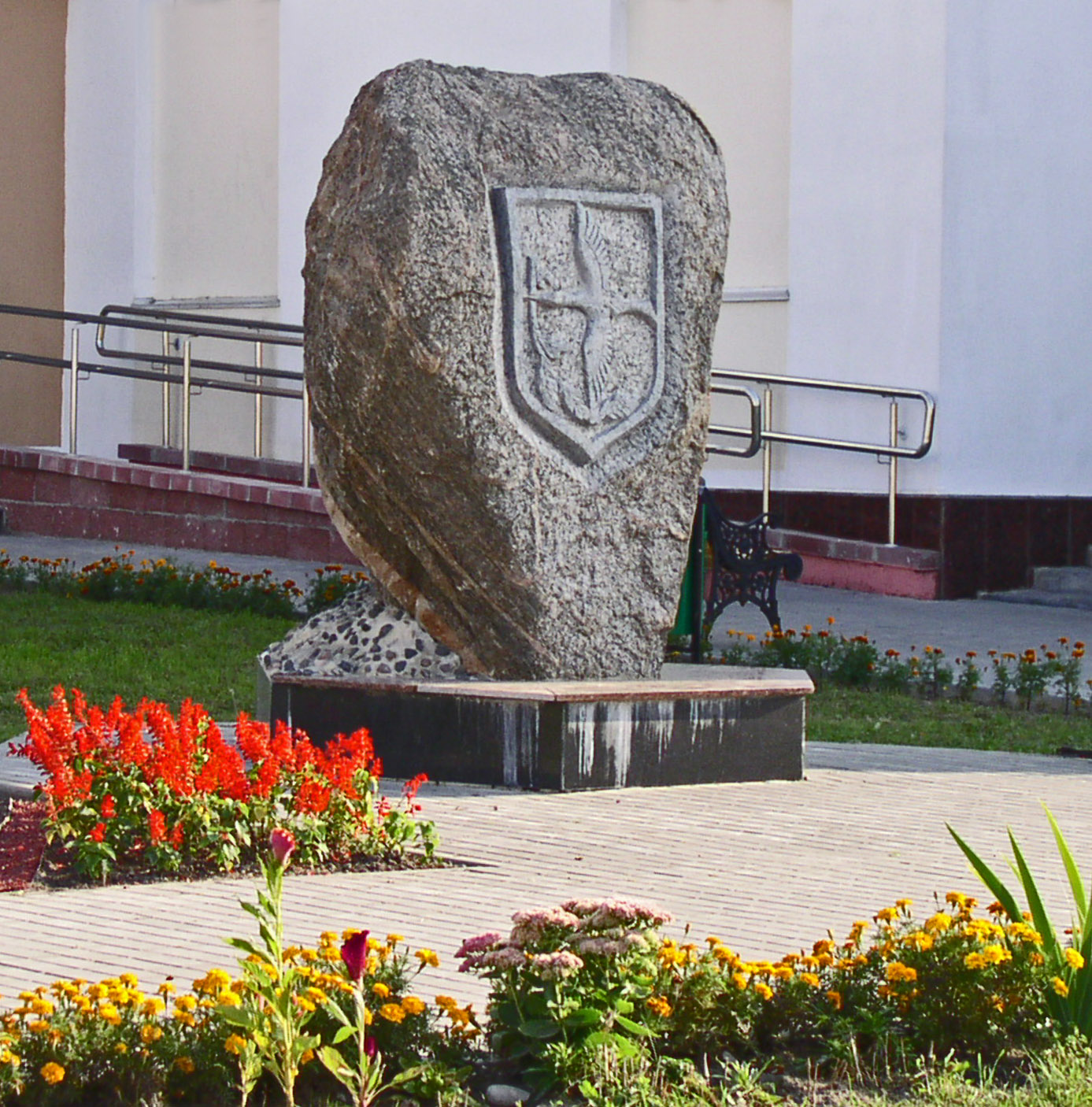
The memorial in the central square commemorates the first record about Stolin dated 1555. It features the coat of arms of the town

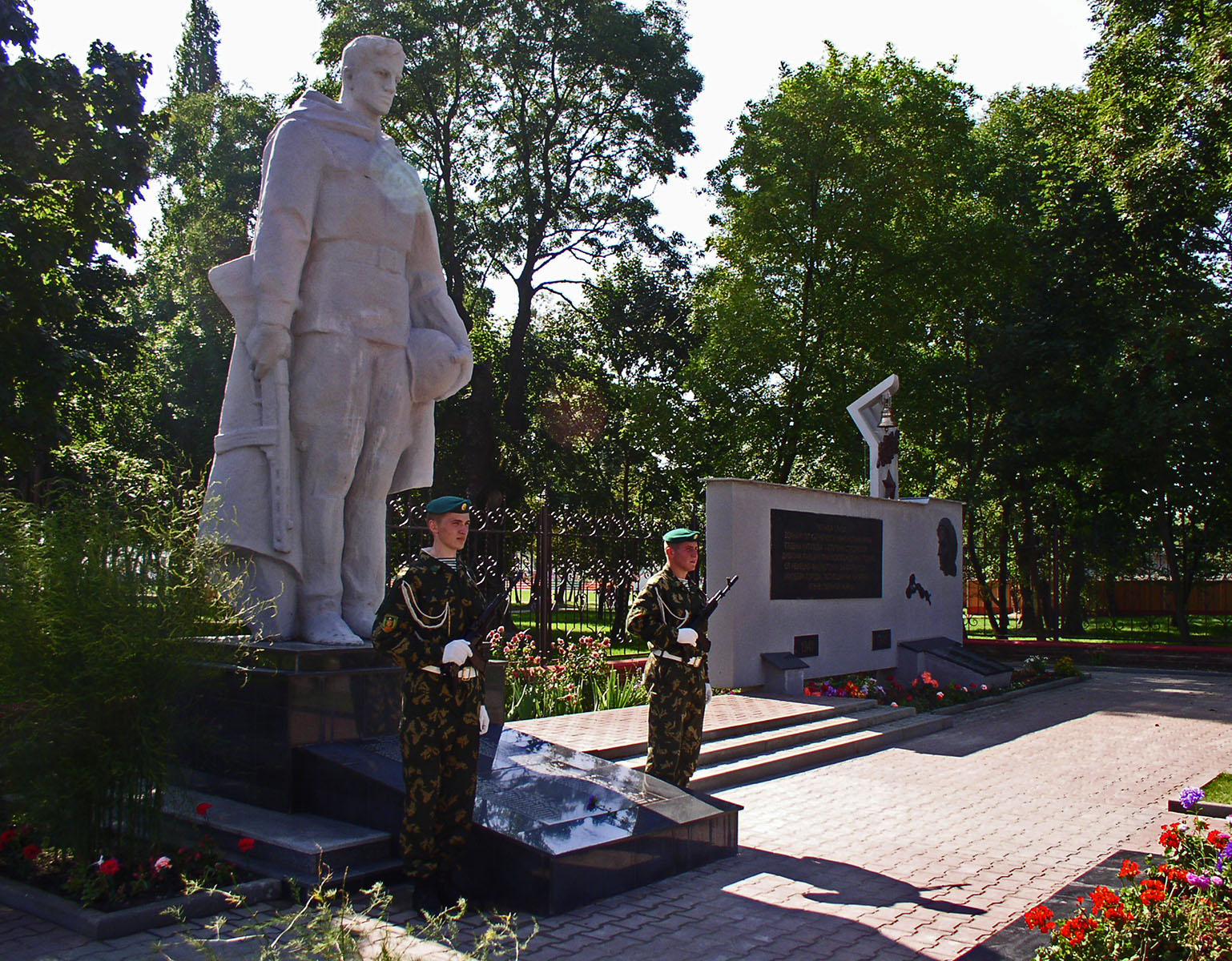
The war memorial of Stolin by the town's park

== See also ==
- Stolin (Hasidic dynasty)
- Pale of Settlement
- Holocaust/Shoah
