= Stolin district =

District of Brest region, Belarus

Stolin district Столінскі раён (Belarusian) Столинский район (Russian)
- District
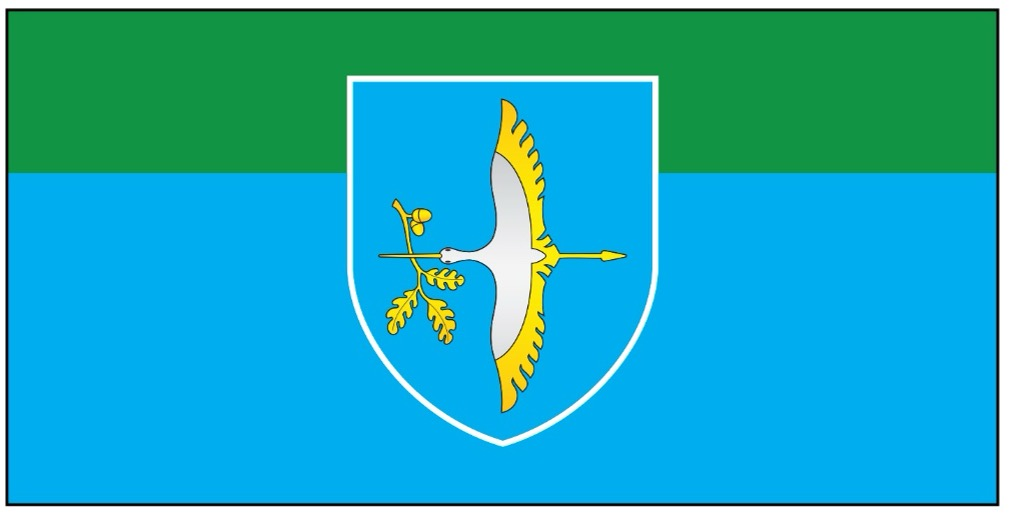
- Flag Coat of arms

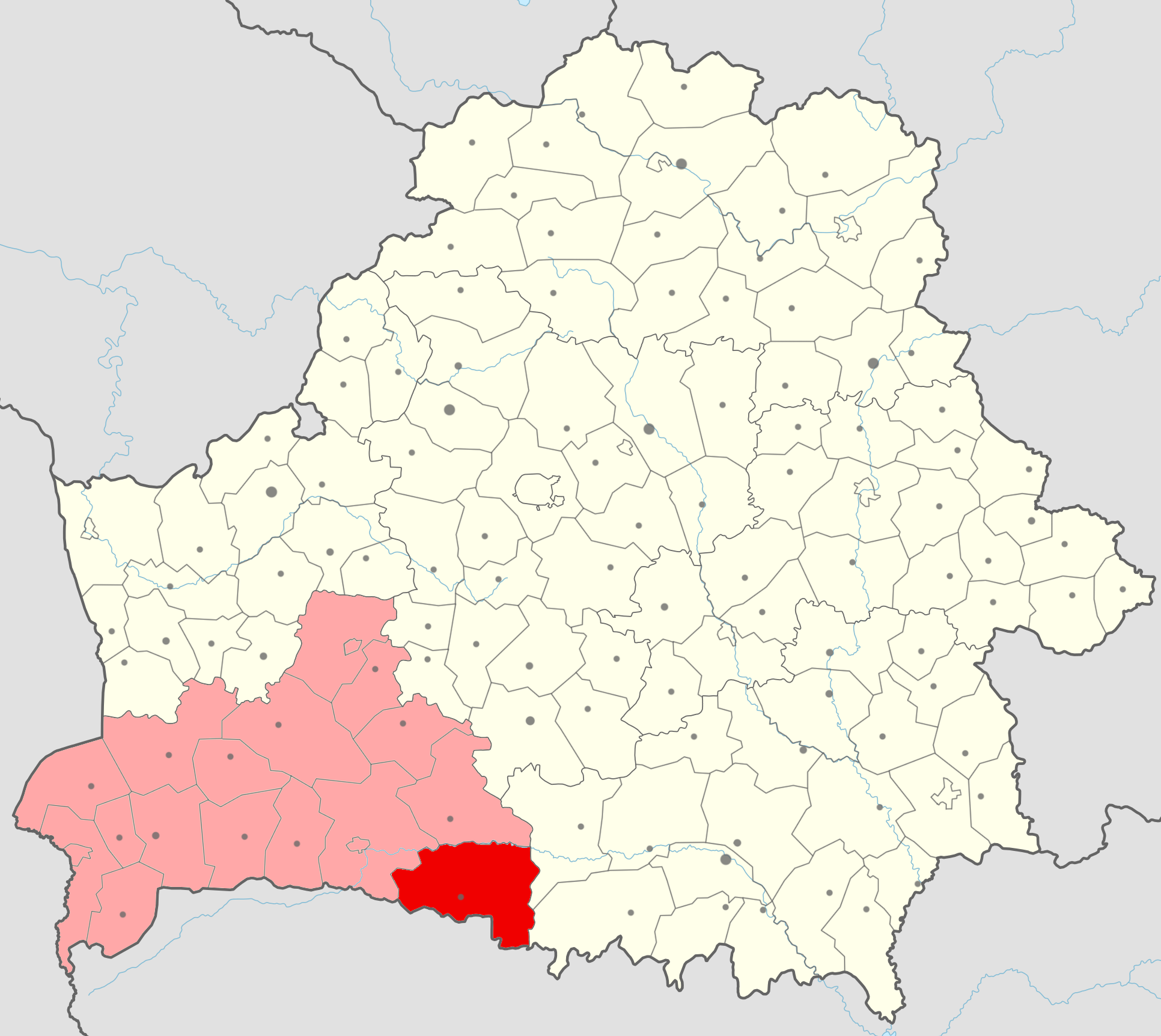
- Coordinates: 51°54′01″N 26°51′22″E
- Country: Belarus
- Region: Brest region
- Administrative center: Stolin

Government
  - Chairman: Grigory Vasilevich Protosovitsky

Area
  - Total: 3,342.06 km^{2} (1,290.38 sq mi)

Population (2024)
  - Urban: 25,137
  - Rural: 43,503
  - Total: 68,640

Ethnicity
  - Belarusian: 97.28%
  - Russian: 1.15%
  - Other: 1.57%
- Time zone: UTC+3 (MSK)
- Area code: 1655
- Cities: 2
- Rural councils: 19
- Settlements: 97
- Website: Official website

Stolin district (Belarusian: Столінскі раён, romanized: Stolinski rajon; Russian: Столинский район, romanized: Stolinsky rayon) is district (raion) in Brest region, Belarus. Its administrative center is in the city of Stolin. At the 1999 Belarusian census, the district had a population of 89,000 people, of which 26,300 people lived in urban areas. As of 2024, it has a population of 68,640.

== History ==
It was established on January 15, 1940.

== Geography ==
The district covers 3,342 square kilometres (1,290 sq mi) and borders the country of Ukraine to its south.

== Demographics ==
At the time of the 2009 Belarusian census, the district had a population of 80,695. Of these, 97.3% were of Belarusian, 1.2% Russian and 0.9% Ukrainian ethnicity. 83.2% spoke Belarusian and 14.7% Russian as their native language. In 2023, it had a population of 69,462.

== Administrative divisions ==
The district is subdivided into two cities and 19 village councils, which administer a total of 97 settlements (1 urban and 96 rural). The two cities are Stolin, the administrative center of the district, and Davyd-Haradok. There is one urban-class village, Rechytsa, which is classified as a worker settlement.

Name	Belarusian	Russian	Status	Settlements
Stolin	Столін	Столин	city of rayon sub-ordinance	
Davyd-Haradok	Давыд-Гарадок	Давид-Городок	city of rayon sub-ordinance	
Byelavusha	Белавушскі сельсавет	Белоушский сельский Совет	village council	2
Byerazhnoye	Беражноўскі сельсавет	Бережновский сельский Совет	village council	6
Vyalikaye Malyeshava	Велікамалешаўскі сельсавет	Большемалешевский сельский Совет	village council	5
Vyelyamichy	Веляміцкі сельсавет	Велемичский сельский Совет	village council	4
Vidziborats	Відзіборскі сельсавет	Видиборский сельский Совет	village council	11
Hlinka	Глінкаўскі сельсавет	Глинковский сельский Совет	village council	5
Haradnaya	Гараднянскі сельсавет	Городнянский сельский Совет	village council	7
Lyadzyets	Лядзецкі сельсавет	Лядецкий сельский Совет	village council	4
Man'kavitsy	Манькавіцкі сельсавет	Маньковичский сельский Совет	village council	2
Al'shany	Альшанскі сельсавет	Ольшанский сельский Совет	village council	3
Plotnitsa	Плотніцкі сельсавет	Плотницкий сельский Совет	village council	5
Radchytsk	Радчыцкі сельсавет	Радчицкий сельский Совет	village council	5
Ramyel'	Рамельскі сельсавет	Ремельский сельский Совет	village council	4
Rubyel'	Рубельскі сельсавет	Рубельский сельский Совет	village council	2
Rukhcha	Рухчанскі сельсавет	Рухчанский сельский Совет	village council	6
Struga	Стружскі сельсавет	Стружский сельский Совет	village council	11
Fyodory	Фядорскі сельсавет	Федорский сельский Совет	village council	2
Kharomsk	Харомскі сельсавет	Хоромский сельский Совет	village council	5
Rechytsa	Рэчыцкі сельсавет	Речицкий сельский Совет	village council	8

Historical population
Year	Pop.	±%
1959	99,121	—
1970	102,184	+3.1%
1979	98,905	−3.2%
1989	91,291	−7.7%
1999	89,026	−2.5%
2009	80,695	−9.4%
2017	73,331	−9.1%

== Notable people ==
- Helena Skirmunt, painter and sculptor
- Nadzeya Ostapchuk, athlete

== See also ==
- Horodno Ghetto
