= Yampil, Khmelnytskyi Oblast =

Rural locality in Khmelnytskyi Oblast, Ukraine

Yampil Ямпіль
- Rural settlement
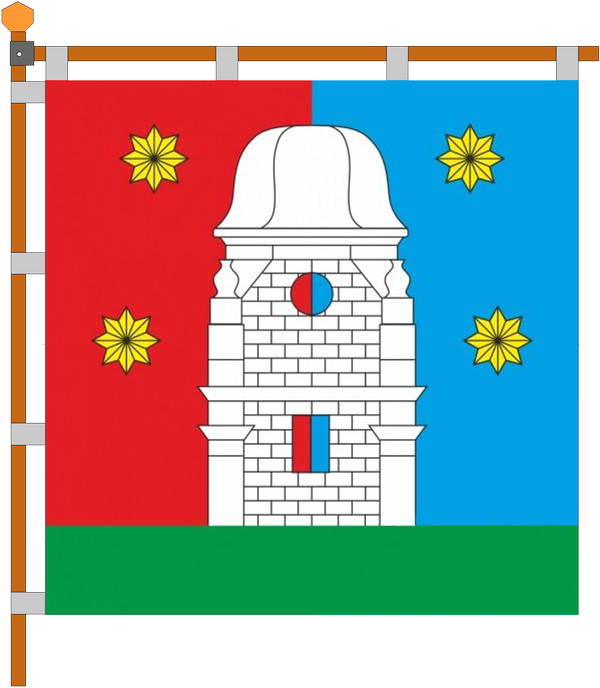
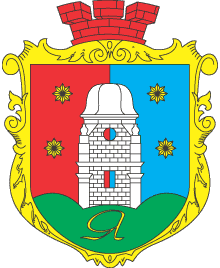
- Flag Coat of arms

- Location within Khmelnytskyi Oblast Location within Ukraine
- Coordinates: 49°57′29″N 26°13′48″E
- Country: Ukraine
- Oblast: Khmelnytskyi Oblast
- Raion: Shepetivka Raion
- Hromada: Yampil settlement hromada
- Established: 1535

Area
  - Total: 0.34 km^{2} (0.13 sq mi)

Population (2020)
  - Total: 1,854
- Time zone: UTC+2 (EET)
  - Summer (DST): UTC+3 (EEST)
- Postal Code: 30231
- Area code: 3841

Yampil or Yampol (Ukrainian: Ямпіль; Russian: Ямполь; Yiddish: יאמפאלא; Old Polish: Jampol) is a rural settlement in Shepetivka Raion, Khmelnytskyi Oblast, western Ukraine. It is located 25 miles southeast of Kremenets. Yampil hosts the administration of Yampil settlement hromada, one of the hromadas of Ukraine. Population: 1,815 (2022 estimate). The city is along the Highway H02.

== History ==
Until 18 July 2020, Yampil belonged to Bilohiria Raion. The raion was abolished in July 2020 as part of the administrative reform of Ukraine, which reduced the number of raions of Khmelnytskyi Oblast to three. The area of Bilohiria Raion was merged into Shepetivka Raion.

Until 26 January 2024, Yampil was designated urban-type settlement. On this day, a new law entered into force which abolished this status, and Yampil became a rural settlement.

== Geography ==
The city is located along Horyn River, a tributary of the Pripyat, and is part of the Podolsk Plateau, while straddling the border with Lesser Polissia.^{[uk]} Yampol is located in the more elevated part of Khmelnytskyi Oblast, in the Volyn highlands, where the average elevation is 329 meters above sea level.

== History ==
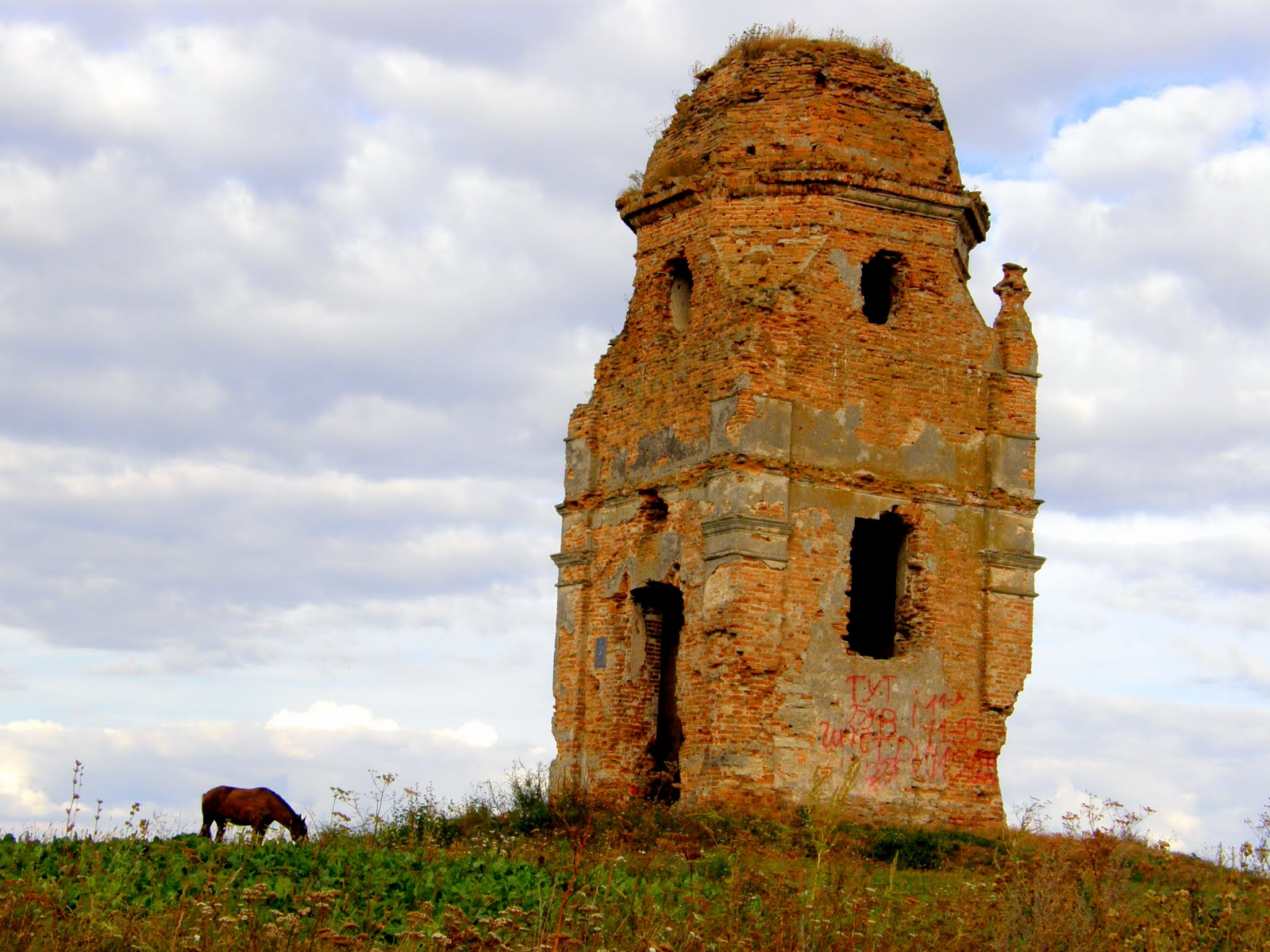
Remnants of the 16th-century Arian chapel in Yampil

During most of the 16th century, Yampil was part of Ruthenian feudal land, owned by various nobles. On January 30, 1535, Nobleman Hrytsko and Roman Senyuty sold the Tykhomel settlement, which encompassed modern-day Yampil, to Prince Janusz, Bishop of Vilnius, for either 150 Lithuanian kopa or 460 silver rubles. He renamed the city Yanushpol (Янушполем), which is the etymology for the modern-day name of the russified Yampil. Following the Union of Lublin, Yampil, along with the rest of the Volhynian Voivodeship, became a part of the Polish-Lithuanian Commonwealth.

Following the Second Partition of Poland, Yampil fell under control of Imperial Russia. It was part of the Kremenetsky Uyezd in the Volhynia Governorate. Following the Russian Revolution, it eventually became a part of the Ukrainian Soviet Socialist Republic.

== Jewish community and Holocaust ==
The Jewish community of Yampol dates back to at least the 15th century. In the early 18th century, the Cossack armies of Bohdan Khmelnytsky devastated the area's Jewish population. Blood libel in the 17th and 18th centuries caused additional attacks to the Jewish people. In 1919, Cossack Hetman Shisko led a pogrom against the Jews in the town that contributed to the destruction of Jewish property and the deaths of many Jewish residents.

In an interview with the USC Shoah Foundation, Jewish former resident of Yampol Ida Kritman recounted the settlement's invasion by the Nazis. Following the July 3rd, 1941 invasion, 852 of the surviving Jews were registered by Nazi forces. In September 1941, Nazi policemen gathered Jews in the town square, before sending them to Bilohiria. The houses of Jews were taken down by locals. Yampilese Jews stayed in the Bilohiria Ghetto until June 27, 1942, when they were evacuated by the Nazis, taken to nearby woodland area, and shot, most likely by the Einsatzgruppen. It is believed that Kritman was the only survivor of the Liakhovets (now: Bilohiria) Ghetto.

Yampol's most distinguished rabbi was Rabbi Yechiel Michel of Zlotshov ("Reb Mechele") the Maggid of Zlotshov and his son Reb Yosef of Yampol. Michel was a disciple of the Baal Shem Tov, and is buried in the town. Similarly, the "Noda Bihuda" (Rabbi Yechezkel Landau) served as Rav in the town, before moving to Prague.

The city is known for its historic Jewish cemetery, where the first Ohel over a Hasidic grave site was built - over Rabbi Yechiel Michel's grave. (The Ohalim over the graves of Rabbi Michel's masters, the "Baal Shem Tov" and "Magid Of Mezritch", were built years later.) This was copied by other Hasidic Dynasties. Rabbi Moshe Landau, the current chief rabbi of Yampol, had pumped millions of dollars into the town to restore historic parts of Yampol; although he is still a resident of Yampol, his main residence is in New York, and he travels to Ukraine frequently for the holidays or special events. He is known as Yampola'r Rebbe. Landau is a direct descendant of Yechezkel, and both are direct descendants of Rashi.

In 2002 the foundation of the original "Ohel" was discovered by the current Yampola'r Rabbi, and a new building was built over the grave sites, which attracts thousands of visitors each year, especially during the summer months; a modern four-star hotel, named "Promenade", was built next to the old cemetery to accommodate the thousands of visitors.

== Demographics ==
In 1765, Yampil had 476 inhabitants. The city had 2,073 residents as of the 2001 Census That number had fallen to 1,854 by 2020.

== See also ==
- Bilohiria, the other urban-type settlement in the Bilohiria Raion
