= Horyn =

Horyn Haryn
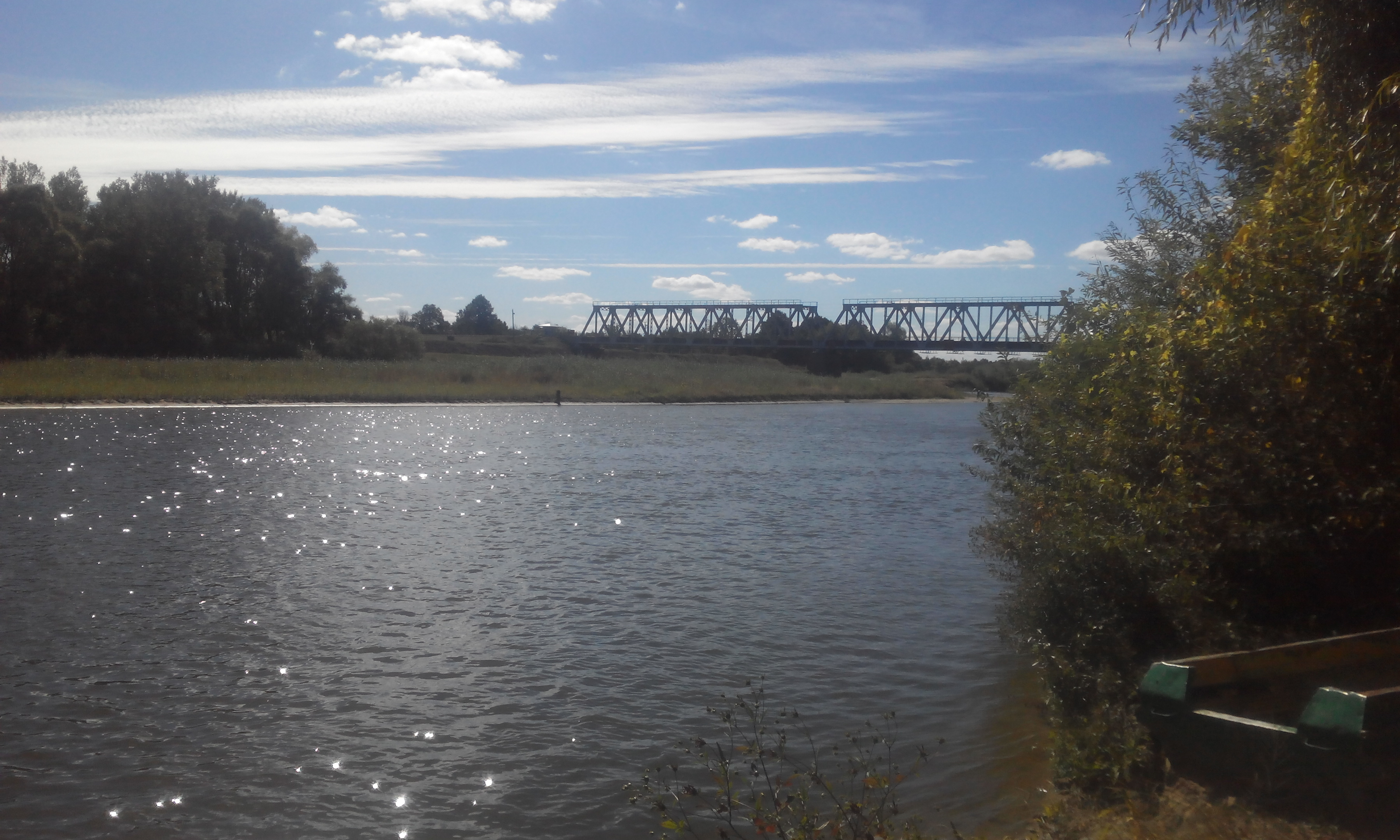

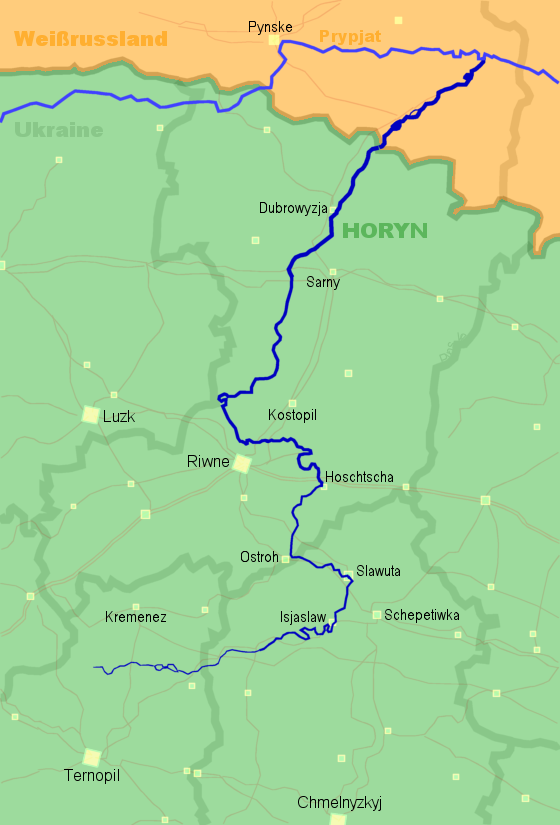
- A map shown with the Horyn River flowing through Ukraine and Belarus.
- Native name: Горинь (Ukrainian); Гарынь (Belarusian)

Location
- Country: Ukraine, Belarus

Physical characteristics
- Source
  - location: Ternopil Oblast, Ukraine
- Mouth: Pripyat
  - coordinates: 52.1437°N 27.2826°E
- Length: 659 km (409 mi)
- Basin size: 27,700 km^{2} (10,700 sq mi)

Basin features
- Progression: Pripyat→ Dnieper→ Dnieper–Bug estuary→ Black Sea

The Horyn or Haryn (Ukrainian: Горинь, IPA: [ɦoˈrɪnʲ]; Belarusian: Гарынь, IPA: [ɣaˈrɨnʲ]; Russian: Горынь, romanized: Goryn; Polish: Horyń) is a tributary of the Pripyat, which flows through Ukraine and Belarus. The Horyn is 659 kilometres (409 mi) long, and has a drainage basin of 27,700 square kilometres (10,700 sq mi). It has a maximum width of 80 m, and a maximum depth of 16 m. An important tributary of the Horyn River is the Sluch.

The Horyn takes its source in the Ternopil Oblast of Ukraine, south of the city of Kremenets, located north of the administrative center of the Ternopil Oblast, Ternopil. The river then flows north, where it makes s-shaped formations, through the Ukrainian oblasts of Khmelnitsky and Rivne. The river then flows northeast into the Belarusian Brest Region, where it finally flows into the Pripyat.

The Khmelnytskyi atomic power plant, located near the city of Netishyn, uses water from the Horyn for its cooling processes.

Before the river was dammed, which created pollution, it was used for irrigation and fishing. A clean-up effort in September 1996 was a step towards the river's restoration.

Cities and towns located on the river include Iziaslav, Slavuta, Netishyn, Ostroh, Dubrovytsia, Rechytsa, and Stolin.

== Description and geography ==
The length is 659 km (within Ukraine - 577 km), the water intake area is 27,700 km^{2}. The general fall of the river is 218 m. The average inclination of the river is 0.33 ‰. The Horyn River originates from a spring overlooking the daily surface north-west of Volytsia village. In general, it flows from southwest to northeast and flows into the Pripyat from the right bank at 412 km from its mouth, 14 km below the city of David-Gorodok, at an altitude of 127 m above sea level. Within 28 km from the mouth, the river splits into two branches, of which the main is right; the left 26-mile long branch flows into the Pripyat at 417 km. The Horyn basin borders on the west with the Sturo basins, on the east with the Uborti and Svvi basins, and in the south with the Dniester basin.

Its length is 300 km, the average width is 92 km, the greatest width in the middle part is 200 km, the bottom - sharply decreases to 10 km. The upper part of the basin before the confluence of the river Ustia is located on the Volhynian-Podolian Upland and is a plateau with altitudes 385.5–215 m, strongly dissected by valleys of rivers and beams (the density of the narrow-girder network, according to S. Sobolev, is 1-1.25 km per 1 km^{2} surface). The middle and lower parts of the wastewater lie in the region of a significantly marshy lowland plain of Polissya, characterized by a flat relief with sandy hills.

Within the plateau, Cretaceous sands, marls, limestone and chalk occur in the form of protrusions in the valleys of rivers, lined with ancient crystalline rocks, mostly granite, and covered with a thick layer of tertiary sands, clay, marl and shellfish. Quaternary formations are represented by fluvioglacial sands and loams, as well as forests in which fertile gray forest soils and black earths are developed.

Within the Polissya, moraine deposits are commonly found, usually loams with different composition of boulders, fluvioglacial sands and forest-like loams with surface cover of sod-podzolic soils; large areas are occupied by peatlands. Groundwater belongs to Devonian and Cretaceous deposits, and within the crystalline massif they are bound to cracks in crystalline rocks. Within the limits of Polissya, the depth of groundwater is insignificant.

Most of the surface of the pool is plowed; Forests covering 1950 km^{2} (18%) are prevalent in the lower reaches and consist of pine trees with oak impurities; In the upper reaches are broadleaved forests (oak, hornbeam, maple, ash), preserved along the slopes of river valleys and beams. In the lower reaches a considerable area is occupied by low-lying reed beds and shallow bogs, the total area of which is 1700 km^{2} (6%). Somewhere there are lands covered with meadow vegetation. The lakes in the basin are very small (0.1%).

The river network is well developed, thanks to the climatic conditions and the nature of the soil. The density of the river network without taking into account the rivers, up to 10 km long, is 0.26, and the latter account is 0.46. Sloping and moderately steep slopes are usually planted, steep - covered or covered with mixed forest and shrub. In the lower reaches are marshy meadows.

In the upper reaches, the slopes are composed of limestone and chalky rocks, covered with sandy loam and loam, often exposed to the appearance of ancient crystalline rocks; in other areas they are mostly sandy and sandy. In the upper and middle streams of the river on both slopes (alternating along the banks) at a height of 3–8 m above the river are located terraces, wide from 0.3 to 4 km, with a steep ledge, a height of 5–10 m. Their surface is predominantly smooth, plowed, rarely covered with pine or mixed forests.

In the upper reaches of the river at the foot of the slopes there are leaks of groundwater.

In the upper reaches of the river, the floodplain is waterlogged, is covered mostly with meadow-bog vegetation, less often with shrubs and individual trees. In other areas, it is mostly dry, meadow, strongly overwhelmed by elders, gullies and lakes, along the banks of which there are thick thickets of cane and shrub (willow, weeping willow). There are sandy ridges and separate hills, with a height of 1 to 8 m. At the slopes, the lower part of it is marshy and is a wet meadow. Soils are muddy-sandy and clay, in wetlands peaty.

Annually in the period of spring water and rain floods the floodplain is flooded to a depth of 0.5 to 3.3 m for 1–2 weeks; In reduced areas, water is contained within 1–3 months

== Tributaries ==
- Left: Horynka, Trostianka, Ustia, Vyrka, Viliya, Stubazka, Zarnivka, Melnytsia, Chakva, Berezhanka, Syren, Lepekha, Soshen.
- Right: Zhyrak, Kalynka, Polkva, Vydava, Lubiakhivka, Ponora, Ocheretynka, Tsvitokha, Bohushivka, Hnylyi Riv, Zhylzhanka, Borkova, Zamchysko, Kosma, Zulnia, Sluch, Hlyboka Dolyna.

== Populated points ==
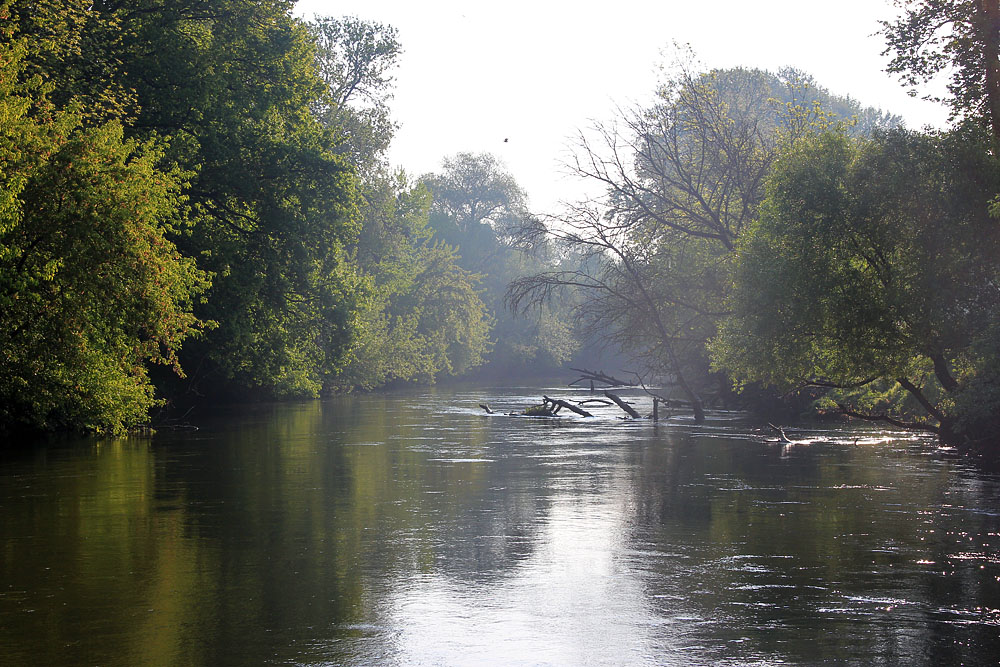
Horyn River in Derazhne

Cities: Lanivtsi, Izyaslav, Slavuta, Netishyn, Ostroh, Dubrovytsia, Stolin, David-Gorodok.

Urban-type settlements: Vyshnivets, Yampil, Bilohiria, Hoshcha, Orzhiv, Stepan, Richytsya, Oleksandria and Derazhne.

The river flows through the Kremenets Raion of the Ternopil region, Shepetivka Raion of the Khmelnytskyi region, as well as Dubno, Rivne and Sarny Raion of the Rivne region.

== Ecology ==
Due to economic activity in the basin, there are crisis situations. The first of these is the placement of the Khmelnytskyi NPP in the upper reaches (on the border of the Khmelnytsky and Rivne regions). Due to the unsolved problem of technical water supply from the Southern Bug River, the NPP relieves the peak flood values, leaving only the minimum runoff in the channels of the channel. This leads to the development of channel erosion, siltation of wintering pits, channeling channels. As a result, during the years there was no observed flood in the upper and middle flows, there is no energy exchange between the channel and the floodplain, the phenomena of stagnation have developed. From the aquatic ecosystem, a group of macrophytes disappears, first of all rhest, ai, and jugs.

The second of these problems is the processes of extended depression of groundwater formed in the Cretaceous-Marl region (the Goshchansk-Ostrozhsky region) due to the groundless collection of underground water for drinking water supply in the city of Rivne. The intense infiltration in the groundwater aquifers of the surface runoff enhances the channeling of the channel and degradation of the river ecosystem. Supplements the formation of the crisis situation in the Gorin River pollution of industrial and stormwater from the chemical association "Azot" below the city of Rivne and discharges of sewage from the Orzhiv wood-processing plant below the mouth of the Ustya River. In general, the formation of the quality of river basin waters is determined by the salt background (chlorides), nutrient-phosphate compounds, channel erosion, toxic impurities (copper).

According to the complex ecological index, the river in the mouth part can be attributed to the class of moderately polluted rivers and transitional to the contaminated.

The quality of river waters worsen periodic discharges (emergency) of sewage from sugar factories (Ostrozky, Babino-Tomahovsky, Mizotsky).

== Hydrology ==
The Horyn hill in the upper part of the current is moderately vorticular, in the middle and lower, it is strongly winding (the radius of curvature of the gentes in places reaches 20–40 m), mostly unbranched. The width of the river to the mouth of the Polkva River is 3–10 m, below - 25–60 m, the largest - 19 m (the outskirts of the village of Vorona), the smallest - 0.5 m (village Mala Goryanka). Depths are distributed unevenly; on the plains 1.4-2.5 m, in places up to 5–11 m, on rolls down to 0.3–1 m. The velocities of the flow on the valleys are insignificant (0.1-0.3 m/s), on rocks are increasing to 0.5-1.3 m/s.

The river Horyn basin on the hydrographic map of Ukraine The bed is slightly overgrown with reeds, sedges and algae, mostly offshore, with a strip of 3–5 m; in the lower reaches, littered with sunken logs, rags and trees that fell from the shores.

The bottom is mostly sandy, on rolls sometimes covered with pebbles, on the plains are silted; in the upper reaches on separate stony areas. Shore a height of 1 to 6 m, mostly steep or steep, on alternating places alternating with flat and very flat, in the upper part they are often peaty, hermetic, less rocky or loamy, on other segments sand or sandy-clay, washed out by water and, collapse, collapse into the river, along with shrubs that grow on them, and separate trees. In many places, they merge with the slopes of the valley. The river is mostly snowy with a significant participation of rain and earth.

In the course of the year, high spring floods, low summer currents, disturbed by short-term rain floods, autumn and winter rise of water are allocated. The rise in the spring often begins in March, and rarely in February, it occurs intensively (up to 0.5-1.0 m/day) and in the middle or second half of March the highest level reaches for the normal full-length 0.8-4.6 m, with exceptionally high - 1.2-5.8 m. As a rule, a full-blooded animal passes one peak and very rarely two. The recession is slow, within one to two months, and of course, at the end of May–June, there are setbacks.

Rains that fall almost year-round cause floods to grow at an average of 0.5-1.5 m, and rarely reaching the level of spring full-bird. In October, the rise of the water level, which lasts until the ice age begins; after freezing the level is reduced, but remains above the summer. In winter, when flooding occurs, there are floods, a height of 0.5-2.5 m. The most abundant river is in the spring (III-IV), when it passes 42-54% of annual drain, for the summer and autumn (VI-XI) it accounts for 31-39%, for the winter (XII-II) - 15-21%.

The largest water consumption of the water-rich 1932 near the village. Voloshka was 1108 m^{3}/s, near the village. Antonovka 1610 m^{3}/sec, corresponding to drainage modules 162 and 142 dm^{3}/s with 1 km^{2}. The lowest runoff modules in summer and winter do not exceed 0.4-1.2 dm^{3}/s with 1 km^{2}. The average annual drainage module is multi-yearly near the village. Voloshki - 3.96 L/s with 1 km^{2}, near the village. Antonivka - 3.81 L/s with 1 km^{2} in the village. Gorin - 3.56 dm^{3}/s with 1 km^{2}.

The mineralization of the water of the Horyn River in the vicinity of the Khmelnitsky NPP is as follows: spring flood - 502 mg/dm3; summer-autumn measurements - 455 mg/dm^{3}; Winter Meadows - 567 mg/dm^{3}. The mineralization of the water of the reservoir-cooler of Khmelnitsky NPP is: spring flood - 396 mg/dm3; summer-autumn measurements - 401 mg/dm^{3}; winter barges - 405 mg/dm^{3}. Type of water - hydrocarbonate-calcium. [2]

The ice is most likely to come in the middle of December, on the rolls often left the holes that are stored in places throughout the winter. The river is crumbling in the upper reaches at the end of February - beginning of March, in the middle and lower reaches 1–2 weeks later. The upper river is used as a source of hydropower and for fish breeding.

Most of the basin is plowed (over 60%), forests occupy 18% of the basin, marshes - shallow cane and shrubland - were drained by 6%. Floodplain meadows are partially sown, cultivated or under grazing, which leads to their degradation, as well as flushing at high water in the river bed of significant impurities - organic, bacterial and solid runoff.

== Navigation ==
During the occupation of the Second Rzeczpospolita on the territory of Ukraine, the navigable Horyn was only a few weeks in the spring of 1937–1938, that is, at medium-high levels of water. The river was officially considered suitable for navigation from the mouth to Dubrovitsa, the rest was fused.

During the Soviet occupation, the Styr-Horynsky River Transport Administration was created (by the middle of the 1960s the administration was called the [Styr-Horynsky River Transport Agency; in general, in the 1970-1980's, there were three ports: Lutsk, Zarichne and Dubrovitsia, where worked in different years about 260-280 workers and transported 300-350 thousand cargoes a year). This management existed until the collapse of the USSR. At that time the river was mainly basalt and rubble from the Klesiv quarry to the Volyn region. Transportation was carried out with the help of tugs (BC - tugboat, serviceman - two people: captain and motorist, as a rule, graduates of the Kyiv River School), to which they hugged for 2-3 barges. There were also auxiliary boats "Hawk" and "Glukhar". In addition, almost every year the Goryna river was deepened with the help of dredgers in troubled areas. There was even a ship with a serviceman, which lifted oaks from the Goryn river, which fell to the river after the beach washed out. Such an appearance was BC (towing boats).

In the places of Horyn, where there were ferry crossings (near the villages of Velyun and Vysotsk Dubrovitsky district), the servicing of the towing boat was preceded by an acoustic signal. so that a ferry cable could be lowered to the bottom of the river by ferry crossing. After passing the tug, the cable was raised and the ferry could be continued. Due to the fact that Gorin is a relatively not very wide river and that the barges do not carry the tug, either on the shallow or close to the shore, a certain cargo was attached to the last barga, i.e. "Dragons", which stretched the bottom of Gorin. Of course, this had a negative impact on river flora and fauna, especially during spawning. From the city of David-Gorodok to the mouth of the river navigable

== See also ==
Rivers of the Ternopil region Rivers of Khmelnitsky region Rivers of Rivne region

== Notes ==
Top ↑ Gorbunov E. Yu., Matulevskaya T. The origin of the names of the largest rivers of Ukraine // Language culture of a specialist in the context of modernity / Collection of materials of the III Interuniversity student's scientific and practical conference. - Donetsk: DonNTU, 2010. - C. 92–93. Up ↑ Hydroecological state of the Goryn basin in the Khmelnitsky NPP area: Monograph [Electronic resource] / Ed. VK Khilchevsky. - K.: Nika-center, 2011. - 176 p. - ISBN 978-966-521-551-6. Top ↑ I. B. Horyn // Chronicle of Volyn. - 1956. - No. 3. - p. 83

== Sources ==
Hydroecological state of the Goryn basin in the Khmelnitsky NPP area: Monograph [Electronic resource] / Ed. VK Khilchevsky. - K.: Nika-center, 2011. - 176 p. - ISBN 978-966-521-551-6. Ichthyofauna cadastre of the Rivne region / Grohovskaya Yu.R., Volovik G.P., Konontsev S.V. and others; Ed. Moshinsky V. S. and Grohovskaya Yu. R. - Rivne: Doka-center, 2012. - 200 p. Romanchuk O. River Goryn: Past and Present. Horyń // Geographical Commonwealth of the Poles in the Polish and Slavic countries. - Warszawa: Filip Sulimierski i Władysław Walewski, 1882. - T. III: The Hague - Kępy. (floor) - S. 157–159. (floor)

== Link ==
The wikiservice has multimedia data on the subject: Goryn (river) National Nature Park "Podilsky Tovtry". Inland waters of the Ternopil region. Fishing in the Rivne region. Rare species of roundworms and fish of the Rivne region.
