= Pluzhne =

Rural locality in Khmelnytskyi Oblast, Ukraine

Pluzhne Плужне
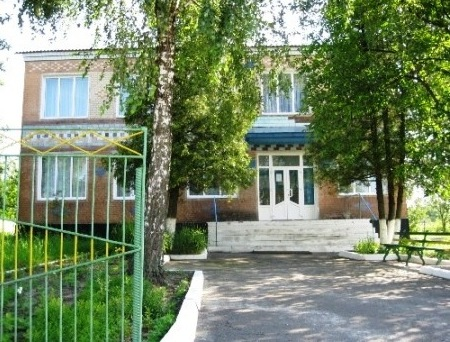
- Pluzhne. Administration

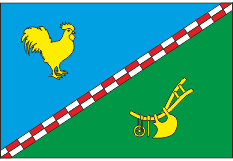
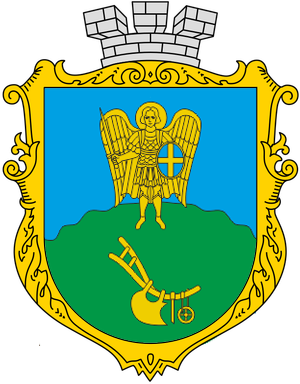
- Flag Coat of arms

- Location in Khmelnytskyi Oblast
- Coordinates: 50°10′49″N 26°33′46″E
- Country: Ukraine
- Oblast: Khmelnytskyi
- Raion: Shepetivka
- First mention date: 1576

Government
  - Mayor: Vitaliy Martyniuk

Area
  - Total: 7,649 km^{2} (2,953 sq mi)
  - Land: 83,660 km^{2} (32,300 sq mi)
- Elevation: 255 m (837 ft)

Population (2001)
  - Total: 3,297
  - Density: 431,170/km^{2} (1,116,700/sq mi)
- Time zone: UTC+2 (EET)
  - Summer (DST): UTC+3 (EEST)
- Postal code: 30320
- Area code: +3803852
- Website: Page on Official Website of Verkhovna Rada

Pluzhne (Ukrainian: Плужне, Belarusian: Плужна, Polish: Płuźno, Płuzhno, Russian: Плужное) is a selo in Shepetivka Raion, Khmelnytskyi Oblast (province), Ukraine. The village is located on the river Ustya, 24 km away from the city of Iziaslav, 44 km away from Shepetivka and 127 km away from Khmelnytskyi. Pluzhne hosts the administration of Pluzhne rural hromada, one of the hromadas of Ukraine. Population is 2,732 inhabitants (as of 2021).

Until 18 July 2020, Pluzhne belonged to Iziaslav Raion. The raion was abolished in July 2020 as part of the administrative reform of Ukraine, which reduced the number of raions of Khmelnytskyi Oblast to three. The area of Iziaslav Raion was merged into Shepetivka Raion.

== Historical demographics of Pluzhne ==
As of 1978, the village's population is 5600

== Gallery ==
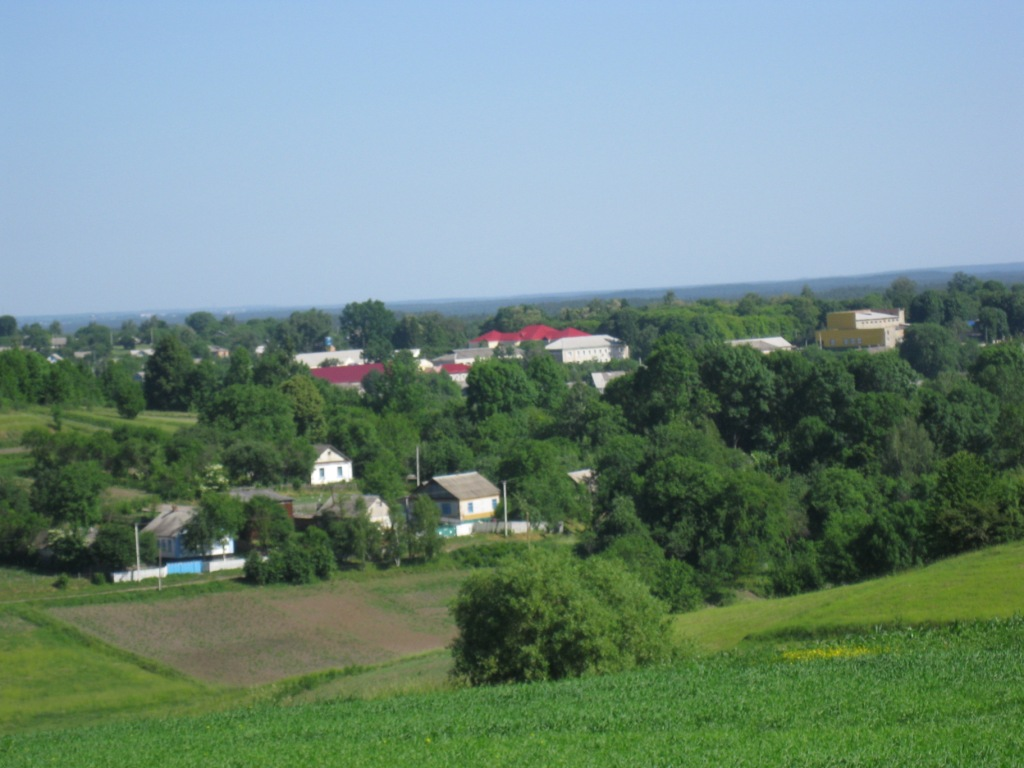
View on the village centre

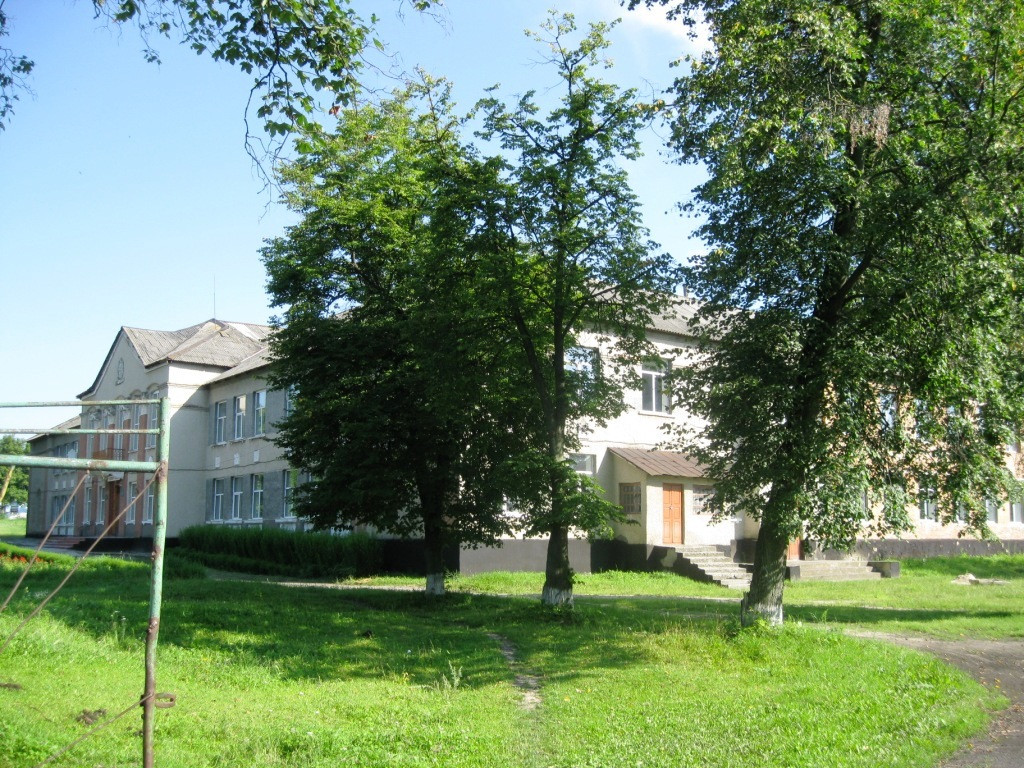
Grammar School

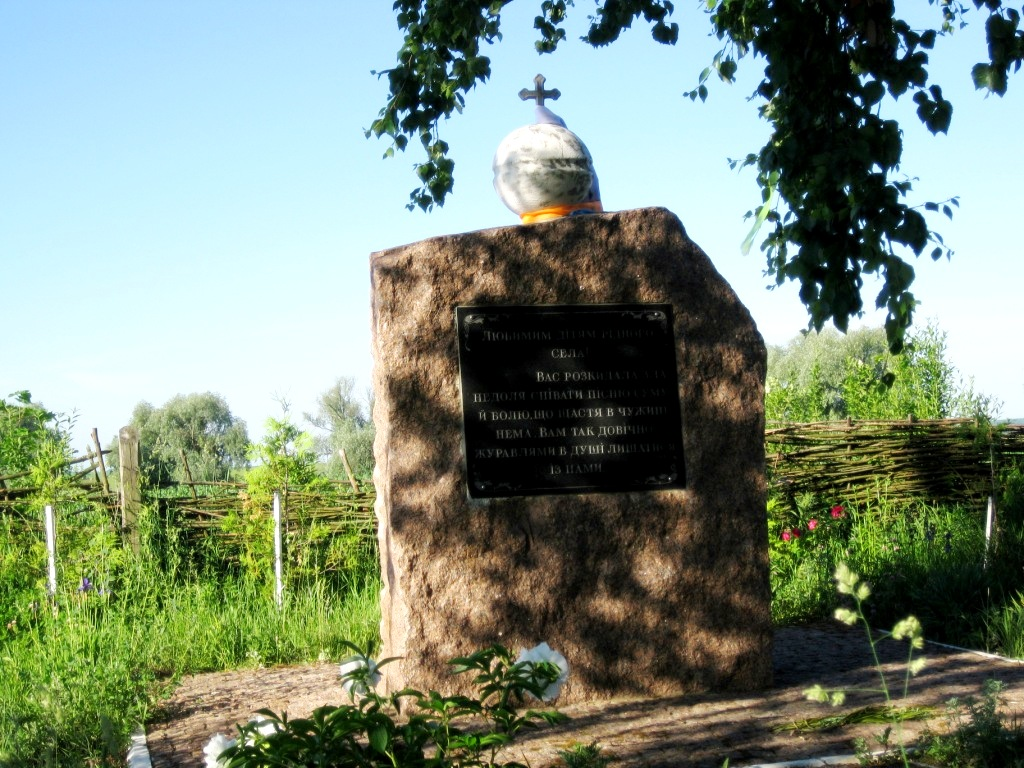
Monument to Children

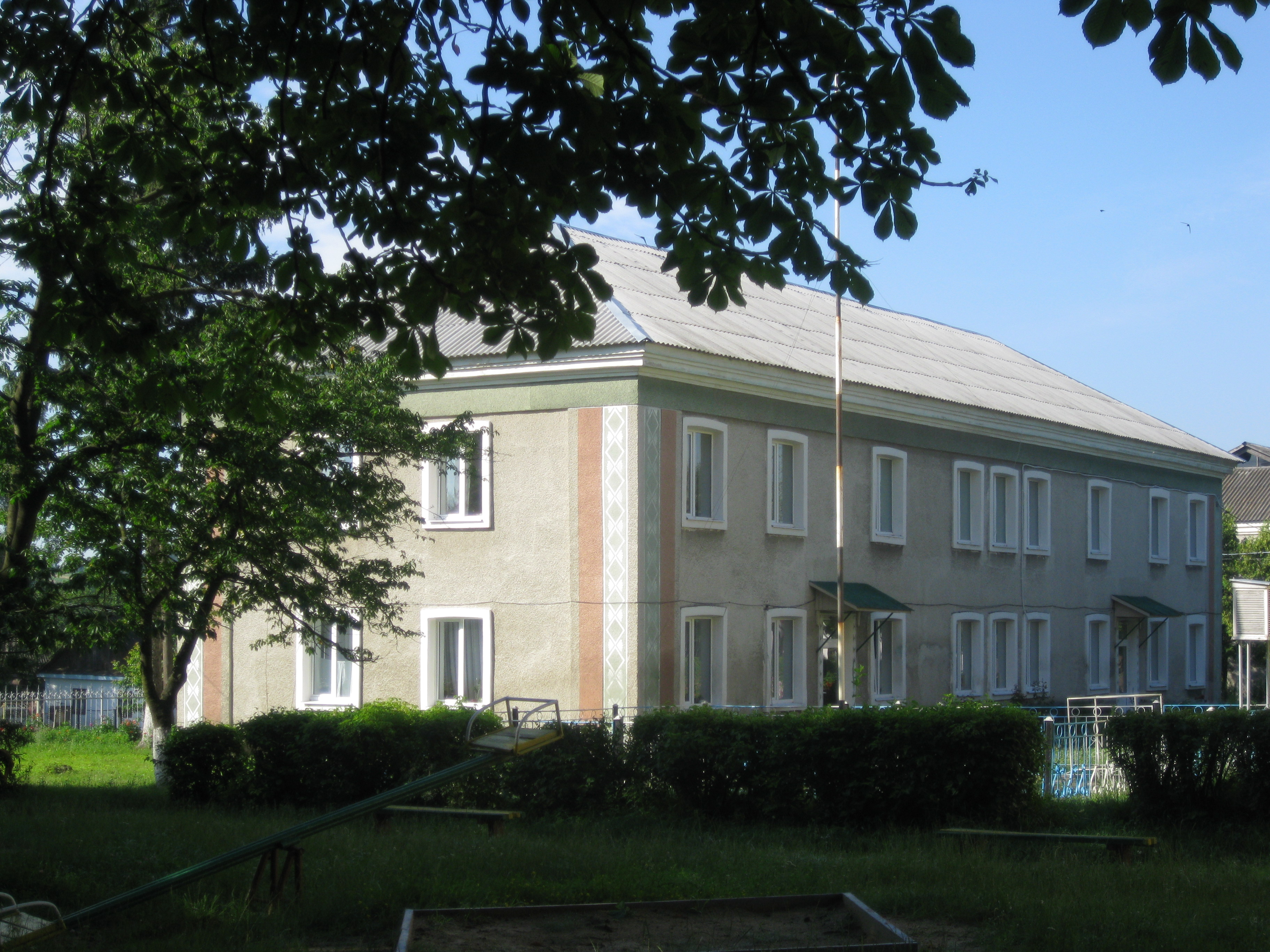
Boarding School
