= Lechotice =

- Municipality
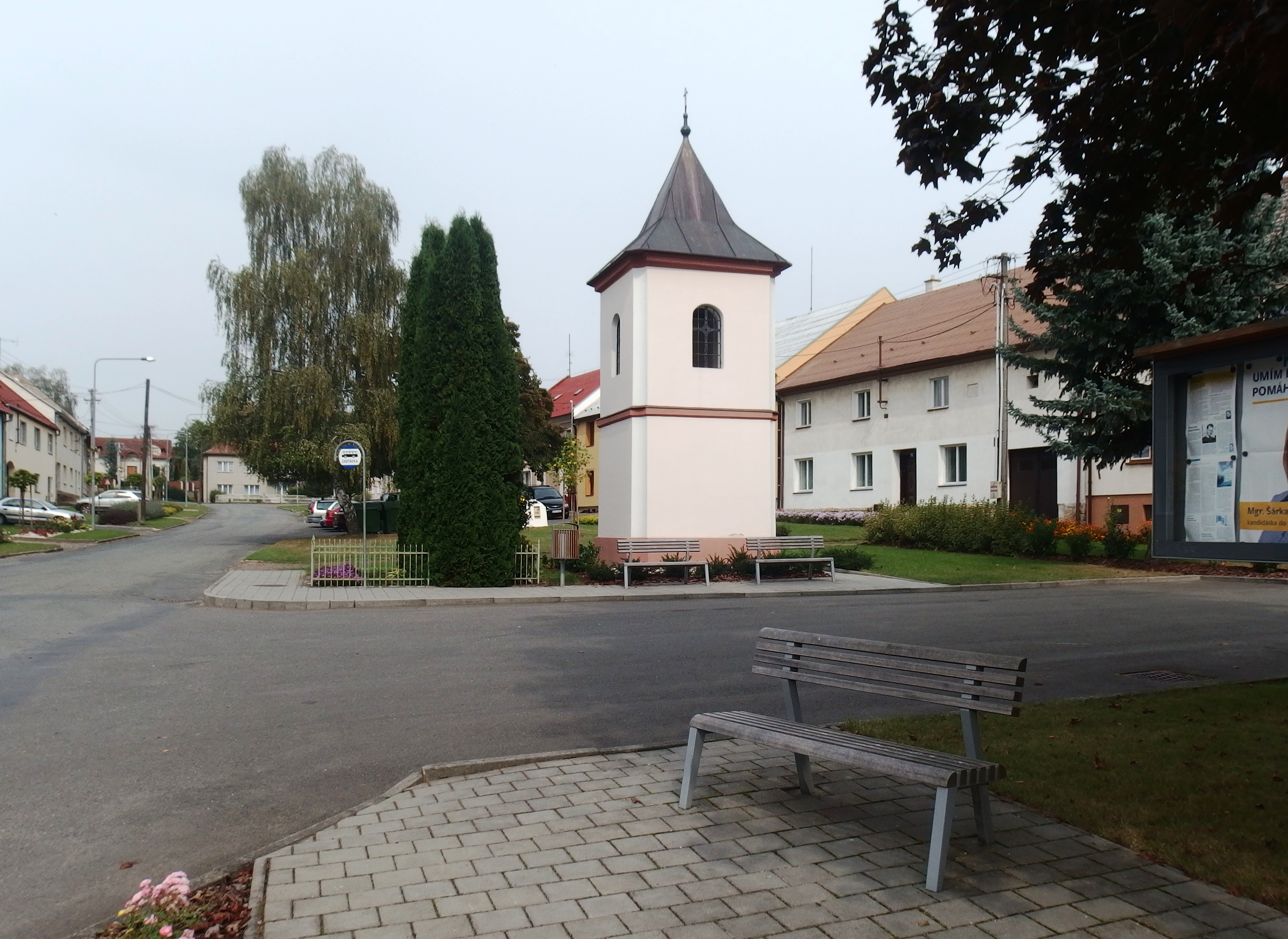
- Belfry in the centre of Lechotice

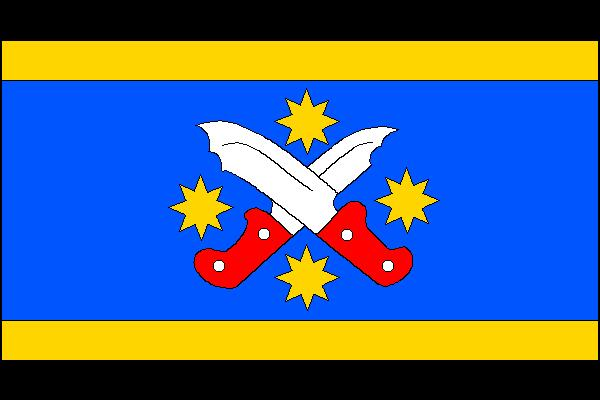
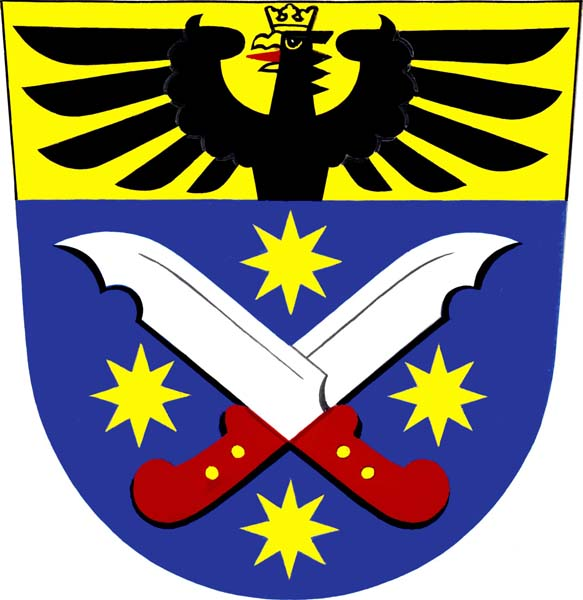
- Flag Coat of arms

- Location in the Czech Republic
- Coordinates: 49°16′25″N 17°35′16″E
- Country: Czech Republic
- Region: Zlín
- District: Kroměříž
- First mentioned: 1342

Area
  - Total: 4.93 km^{2} (1.90 sq mi)
- Elevation: 224 m (735 ft)

Population (2026-01-01)
  - Total: 459
  - Density: 93.1/km^{2} (241/sq mi)
- Time zone: UTC+1 (CET)
  - Summer (DST): UTC+2 (CEST)
- Postal code: 768 52
- Website: www.lechotice.cz

Lechotice is a municipality and village in Kroměříž District in the Zlín Region of the Czech Republic. It has about 400 inhabitants.

Lechotice lies approximately 15 kilometres (9 mi) east of Kroměříž, 8 km (5 mi) north-west of Zlín, and 246 km (153 mi) east of Prague.

== Demographics ==
Historical population
| Year | Pop. | ±% |
|---|---|---|
| 1869 | 374 | — |
| 1880 | 446 | +19.3% |
| 1890 | 439 | −1.6% |
| 1900 | 473 | +7.7% |
| 1910 | 482 | +1.9% |
| 1921 | 478 | −0.8% |
| 1930 | 482 | +0.8% |
| 1950 | 420 | −12.9% |
| 1961 | 444 | +5.7% |
| 1970 | 417 | −6.1% |
| 1980 | 405 | −2.9% |
| 1991 | 363 | −10.4% |
| 2001 | 368 | +1.4% |
| 2011 | 415 | +12.8% |
| 2021 | 405 | −2.4% |
Source: Censuses
