= Antonovca =

Antonovca may refer to several places in Moldova:

- Antonovca, a village in Prajila Commune, Floreşti district
- Antonovca, a village in Copăceni Commune, Sîngerei district
