= Antonivka Bridge =

Antonivka Bridge may refer to:

- Antonivka Railway Bridge
- Antonivka Road Bridge
