= Bilohiria settlement hromada =

Bilohiria settlement hromada Біогірська селищна громада
- Hromada
- Interactive map of Bilohiria settlement hromada
- Country: Ukraine
- Oblast: Khmelnytskyi Oblast
- Raion: Shepetivka Raion

Area
  - Total: 6,156 km^{2} (2,377 sq mi)

Population
  - Total: 19,086
- Website: bilogirska-gromada.gov.ua

Bilohiria settlement hromada (Ukrainian: Білогірська селищна громада) is one of the hromadas of Shepetivka Raion in Khmelnytskyi Oblast in Ukraine. Its administrative centre is the rural settlement of Bilohiria.

== Composition ==
The hromada encompasses 61 localities, which include the rural settlement of Bilohiria (administrative centre) and 60 villages:

- Baimaky
- Danylivka
- Denysivka
- Derzhaky
- Dzvinky
- Hulivtsi
- Hurshchyna
- Ivanivka
- Kalynove
- Kalynivka
- Karasykha
- Karpylivka
- Kashchentsi
- Khoroshiv
- Kornytsia
- Korytne
- Kozyn
- Kuryanky
- Kvitneve
- Lisky
- Mala Borovytsia
- Mali Kaletyntsi
- Mizhhirya
- Mokrovolia
- Nadyshen
- Novosemeniv
- Okip
- Pererosle
- Semeniv
- Shelviv
- Shunky
- Shymkivtsi
- Sosnivka
- Sosnivochka
- Stavyshchany
- Stepanivka
- Sushivtsi
- Syniutky
- Syvky
- Trostianka
- Ukrainka
- Varyvidky
- Velyka Borovytsia
- Velyki Kaletyntsi
- Vesniane
- Vikentove
- Viknyny
- Vilshanytsia
- Vodychky
- Yosypivtsi
- Yuvkivtsi
- Yurivka
- Zahirtsi
- Zahreblia
- Zakit
- Zaluzhzhia
- Zarichchia
- Zhemelyntsi
- Zhyzhnykivtsi
- Zinky
