= Pluzhne rural hromada =

Rural hromada of Khmelnytskyi Oblast, Ukraine

Pluzhne rural hromada Шепетівська міська громада
- Hromada
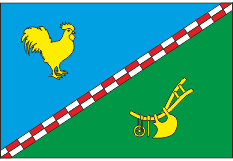
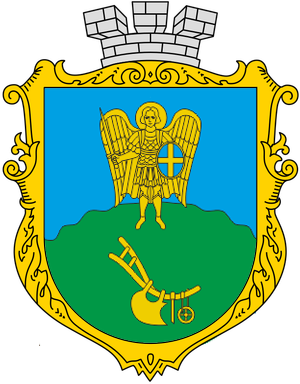
- Flag Seal

- Location within Khmelnytskyi Oblast Location within Ukraine
- Coordinates: 50°10′49″N 26°33′46″E
- Country: Ukraine
- Oblast: Khmelnytskyi Oblast
- Raion: Shepetivka Raion
- Founded: February 11, 2019

Area
  - Total: 356.1 km^{2} (137.5 sq mi)

Population (2020)
  - Total: 7,337
- Website: pluzhnenska-gromada.gov.ua

Pluzhne rural territorial hromada (Ukrainian: Плужненська сільська територіальна громада, romanized: Pluzhnenska silska terytorialna hromada) is one of the hromadas of Ukraine, located in Shepetivka Raion in northern Khmelnytskyi Oblast. Its administrative centre is the village of Pluzhne.

The hromada has a total population of 7,337 (as of 2020), as well as an area of 356.1 km^{2} (137.5 mi^{2}).

== Composition ==
The community includes twenty-three villages:

- Pluzhne
- Antonivka
- Borysiv
- Dertka
- Dobryn
- Dolochcha
- Velyka Radohoshch
- Havrylivka
- Kamianka
- Khoten Druhyy
- Khoten Pershyy
- Kuniv
- Lisna
- Mala Radohoshch
- Myakoty
- Mykhailivka
- Nova Hutyska
- Novosilka
- Stara Hutyska
- Shekeryntsi
- Storonyche
- Syvir
- Zakrynychne
