= Davyd-Haradok =

Town in Brest Region, Belarus

Davyd-Haradok Давыд-Гарадок (Belarusian) Давид-Городок (Russian)
- Town
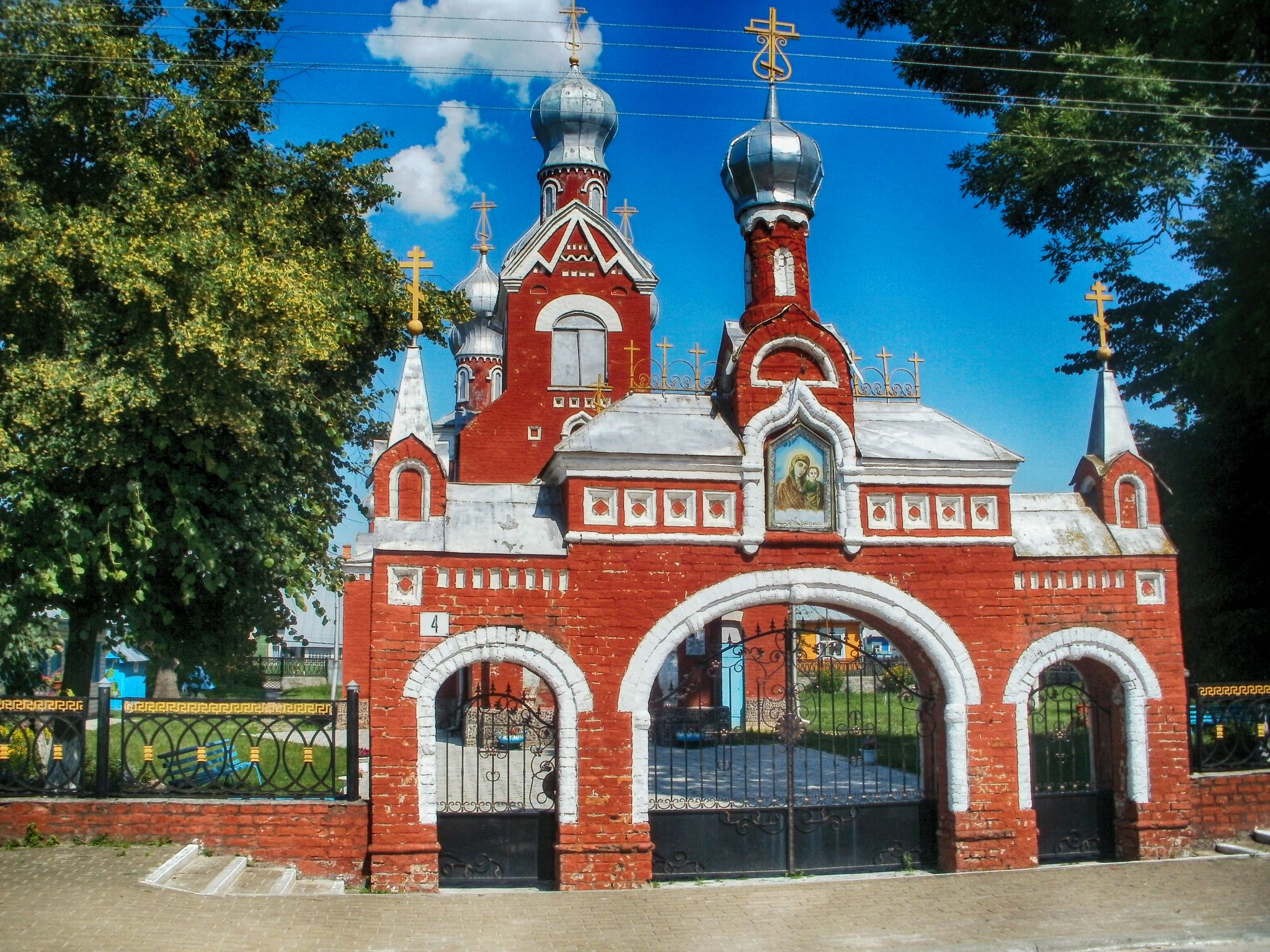

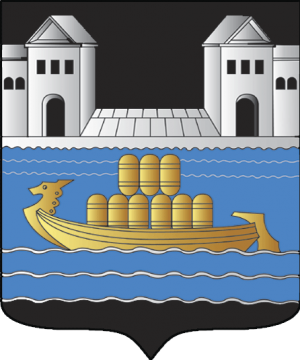
- Coat of arms

- Location in Belarus
- Coordinates: 52°3′20″N 27°12′50″E
- Country: Belarus
- Region: Brest Region
- District: Stolin District
- First mentioned: 1100

Population (2025)
  - Total: 5,658
- Time zone: UTC+3 (MSK)
- Postal code: 225540
- Area code: +375 1655
- License plate: 1

Davyd-Haradok or David-Gorodok (Note: Belarusian: Давыд-Гарадок, IPA: [daˈvɨd ɣaraˈdok], locally: [dɐʋʲid ɦoroˈdɔk]; Russian: Давид-Городок; Polish: Dawidgródek; Yiddish: דוד־האָראָדאָק.) is a town in Brest Region, in southern Belarus. As of 2025, it has a population of 5,658.

== History ==
=== Early history ===
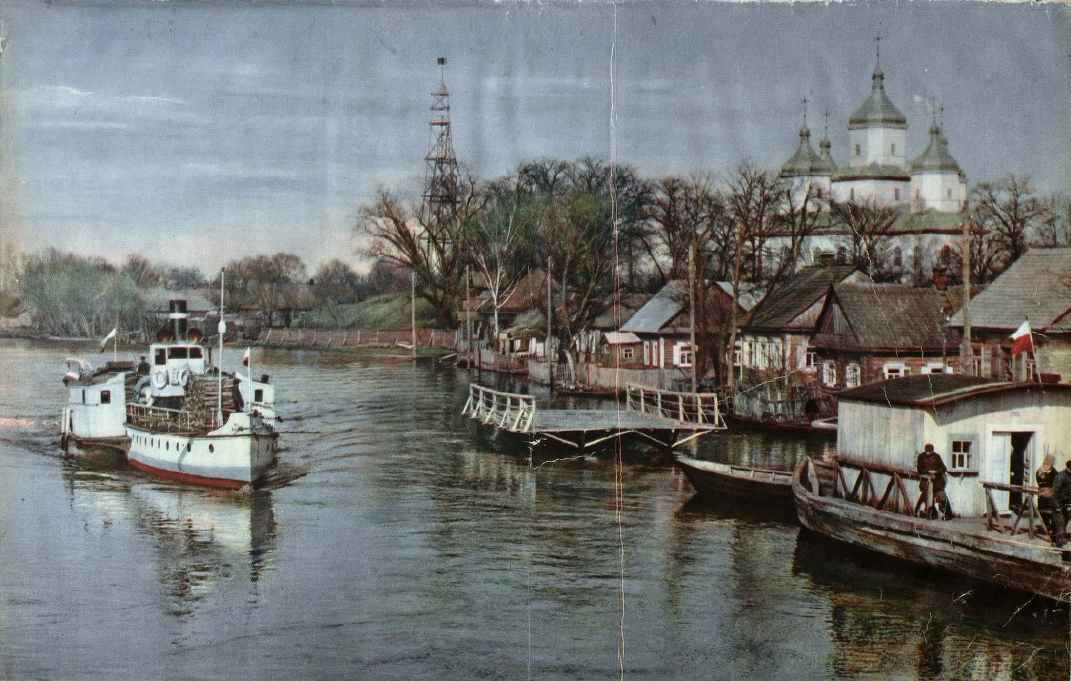
Dawidgródek in 1936

Davyd-Haradok was administratively located in the Pinsk County in the Brest Litovsk Voivodeship within the Grand Duchy of Lithuania and Polish–Lithuanian Commonwealth. From 1586, it was a private town of the Radziwiłł family. It was located on a trade route connecting Pinsk and Mozyrz. In 1793, Davyd-Haradok was acquired by the Russian Empire in the course of the Second Partition of Poland. From 1795 to 1796, the town was briefly a county seat within the Minsk Governorate. The residents were mainly engaged in gardening, vegetable seed production, preparing dried fish, and producing shoes.

The 18 March 1921 Peace of Riga between Poland on one side and Soviet Russia and Soviet Ukraine on the other defined Davyd-Haradok (Dawidgródek) as part of Poland in the interwar period. It was administratively located in the Polesie Voivodeship.

Historical population
Year	Pop.	±%
1921	9,851	—
1931	11,374	+15.5%
2023	5,774	−49.2%

=== World War II ===
Following the invasion of Poland in September 1939 at the start of World War II, the village was occupied by the Soviet Union until 1941. In 1940, more than a third of the total population was Jewish, 4,350 Jews. The town was under German occupation from 7 July 1941 until 9 July 1944. On 10 August 1941, 3,000 Jews older than 14 years old were murdered in a mass execution perpetrated by an Einsatzgruppen unit consisting of Germans and their collaborators.

Survivors were imprisoned in a ghetto where they were forced to perform forced labour and suffered harsh living conditions, many deaths. On 10 September 1942, 1,263 remaining inhabitants of the ghetto, the vast majority women and children, were murdered. About a hundred of them managed to escape to the forest.

One of the bases of the Wachlarz Polish resistance organization was located in the town.

In 1957, surviving Jews from Davyd-Haradok published a memorial book about the community that once existed there and their experiences during the Holocaust.
