= History of Khmelnytskyi =

Timeline of Khmelnytskyi

- Polish–Lithuanian Commonwealth (Crown of the Kingdom of Poland) 1431-1672
- Ottoman Empire 1672-1699
- Polish–Lithuanian Commonwealth 1699-1793
- Russian Empire 1793-1917
- Ukrainian War of Independence
  - Russian Provisional Government Mar-Oct 1917
  - UPRS Oct 1917-Feb 1918
  - Imperial Germany (under occupation, de jure part of the UPR and Ukrainian State) Feb 1918-Nov 1918
  - UPR Nov 1918-Apr 1919
  - UPRS Apr 1919-June 1919
  - UPR June 1919-July 1919
  - UPRS July 1919
  - UPR July 1919-Nov 1919
  - AFSR Nov 1919-Dec 1919
  - Second Polish Republic (under occupation, de jure part of the UPR) Dec 1919-July 1920
  - UPRS/UkrSSR July 1920-Sep 1920
  - Second Polish Republic (under occupation, de jure part of the UPR) Sep 1920-Nov 1920
  - UPRS/UkrSSR Nov 1920
- Ukrainian SSR Nov 1920-Dec 1922
- Soviet Union Dec 1922-1941
- Nazi Germany Nazi Germany 1941–1944 (as part of Reichskommissariat Ukraine, under occupation)
- Soviet Union 1944–1991
- Ukraine 1991–present

The history of Khmelnytskyi starts with the human settlement of the city, which has been attested to since the Bronze Age. The area was then successively inhabited by various cultures, but it would not be until 1431 that the city was first mentioned by Władysław II Jagiełło in a grant as Płoskirów. Płoskirów, during early Polish rule, would remain a small village, with a 1493 register of the Podolian Voivodeship mentioning just over a hundred people. In 1547, Płoskirów was granted to Maciej Włodek of Hermanów, who then developed the village and helped it achieve Magdeburg rights in 1566. A castle was then built in the city in the 1590s, known as the Płoskirów Castle. During the Khmelnytsky Uprising, Płoskirów variously changed hands between the Cossacks and Poles, resulting in the destruction of the city, which was further compounded by raids on it as part of the Polish–Cossack–Tatar War (1666–1671). In 1672, following the Siege of Kamenets, Płoskirów became part of the Ottoman Empire within the Podolia Eyalet. Ottoman rule would not last long, and it was returned to Polish rule by 1699 with the Treaty of Karlowitz. After this, the starostwo of the Zamoyskis resettled Płoskirów with ethnic Poles known as the Mazurs. In 1793, as part of the Second Partition of Poland, the city was then annexed into the Russian Empire as part of the Podolia Governorate and renamed to Proskuriv or also Proskurov.

Like during Polish times, Proskuriv remained a relatively minor city in comparison to the much larger city of Kamianets-Podilskyi. This began to shift in 1870 with the opening of railway lines in the city, which led to Proskuriv rapidly industrialising and also becoming militarily important again, thanks to the stationing of units. By the early 1900s, Proskuriv had become the largest trading centre in the Podolia Governorate. However, during the subsequent Ukrainian War of Independence, which was part of the Russian Civil War, the city constantly saw action, changing hands between the Ukrainian People's Republic, Bolsheviks, Imperial Germans, White movement, and Poles. Notably, the city was the site of the Proskurov pogrom during the war, in which forces under the UPR killed around 1,000 to 1,600 Jews. It was also a temporary capital of the UPR for a time in March 1919, when the Sich Riflemen were also stationed in the city, until the UPR decided to retreat to Rivne. Bolshevik control was consolidated in late 1920, and the city was annexed into the Soviet Union in 1922. During the interwar period, the city was industrialised again, but it was also the site of repressions by the NKVD, which shot 2,060 people during the Great Terror. Proskuriv was made the administrative centre of Khmelnytskyi Oblast shortly before the war in March 1941.

During World War II, after the start of Operation Barbarossa, Proskuriv was occupied by Nazi Germany as part of Reichskommissariat Ukraine from 8 July 1941 to 25 March 1944. During this time, the city was the site of a prisoner of war camp known as Stalag 355, where over 60,000 Soviets were killed. Also, as part of the Holocaust, 9,500 Jews were massacred by the Germans. Proskuriv was liberated in March 1944 as part of the Kamenets–Podolsky pocket. After the war, the city was renamed from Proskuriv to Khmelnytskyi in 1954 in honour of Bohdan Khmelnytskyi. Khmelnytskyi was then made a military city again, hosting the 19th Zaporizhzhian Missile Division of the 43rd Rocket Army, with Khmelnytskyi itself being host to 10 intercontinental ballistic missiles, specifically UR-100s. After the collapse of the Soviet Union, the city became part of an independent Ukraine. During Euromaidan protests in 2013-14, the city was the site of massive protests, with over 7,000 people rallying at Independence Square in January 2014. The Khmelnytskyi Oblast Council building was occupied by protesters in February, during which two protesters were shot, including Liudmyla Sheremet. Despite these events, Khmelnytskyi continued to grow. After the Russian invasion of Ukraine, the city became a major hub for internally displaced people from the frontlines, but has also been the site of multiple Russian attacks, which have killed at least three.

== Antiquity ==
Settlements in the area of modern-day Khmelnytskyi have been extensively attested to in multiple districts of the city. In the eastern part of the city, in the Lezneve microdistrict, materials dating to the Bronze Age and Scythian eras have been found, and in the northern part of the city, in Ozerna, a multi-era settlement has been found starting in the early Iron Age. Other examples include, in the centre at Dubove, Scythian material; from the western part of the city in Hrechany, materials from the Chernyakhov culture, and numerous kurgans from the Scythians that survive in multiple microdistricts, such as Zarichchia and Rakove. One of the more recent artifacts to be found in 2020 near the Nativity of the Theotokos Cathedral was a fragment of a ceramic vessel that dates back to around the 6th-8th centuries AD. The fragment found was 3.6 metres and was suggested to be evidence that the area was visited periodically, and not permanently, during this time.

== Founding of Płoskirów ==
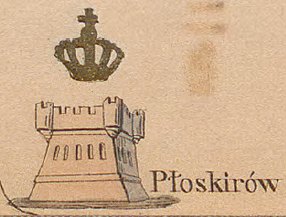
The name of "Płoskirów" on a map.

A commemorative stone from 2000 marking the foundation of the city to 1493.

The first written mention of the city when it was known as Płoskirów dates back to 10 February 1431, when King Władysław II Jagiełło issued in the town of Sopot a royal grant that gave the nobleman Jan Chanstulowski a few villages for the sum of 100 hryvnias. The villages mentioned in this grant are Holysyn (now Oleshyn) and Płoskirowce, which were near the Boh river in the district of Letychiv within Podolia. This is recorded in the Lithuanian Metrica, which states in the original text in Latin, "super villis Holissini et Ploskirowcze super fluvio Boh iacentu in terra Podoliensi et districtu Laticzowiensi sitas." Although Mykhailovsky notes that a separate village also known as Płoskirowce (now Proskurivka) also existed, which could be mistaken for the settlement described as Płoskirowce, the folios consistently record Holysyn as being on the opposite bank of the Boh from Płoskirów, making it impossible for it to be Proskurivka, since that settlement was farther south. Płoskirów/Płoskirowce would again be mentioned four more times prior to 1493 in the Lithuanian Metrica as a royal estate granted out to nobles under tenure. The first time was during the subsequent reign of Władysław III of Poland from 1434 to 1444, when the possession of the settlement is mentioned; the shortened name of "Płoskirów" rather than "Płoskirowce" was first used, which marks the point Płoskirowce began to fall out of use. Płoskirów was again then mentioned in a 16 December 1461 grant by Casimir IV Jagiellon to his servant Mikołaj Śwircz of Bedrychowiec, a Stolnik of Kamieniec Podolski, granting "Płoskirów..in the district of Międzybóż" for 50 hryvnias. The last two times Płoskirów was mentioned pre-1493 was in 1464 and 1470. In the latter, the estate of Śwircz, which was given to his heirs Ivan and Mikołaj de Czessilow, was granted to the castellan of Kamieniec Podolski, Mikołaj z Nowego Dworu of Horodok.

In the 1493 Register of Hearts of the Podolian Voivodeship, which was a tax document, Płoskirów is recorded as having seven households with just over a hundred people and was a wooden-fortified point. This was, until Mykhailovsky's research in 2004, widely considered the founding date of the city, and was the date that the city's 500th anniversary in 1993 was celebrated with badges. Nevertheless, the town would remain relatively insignificant in comparison to the nearby historical capital of Podilia, Kamieniec Podolski, until 26 March 1547 when Sigismund II August, as coregent, granted a lifetime grant of "Płoskirów, Leśniów, and Holyszyn with their environs, lying on the Boh in the Kamieniec district" to Maciej Włodek of Hermanów and the starosta of Kamieniec Podolski as a reward for his military service. In 1550, this was converted into a hereditary grant.

== Early Polish rule and Płoskirów Castle ==
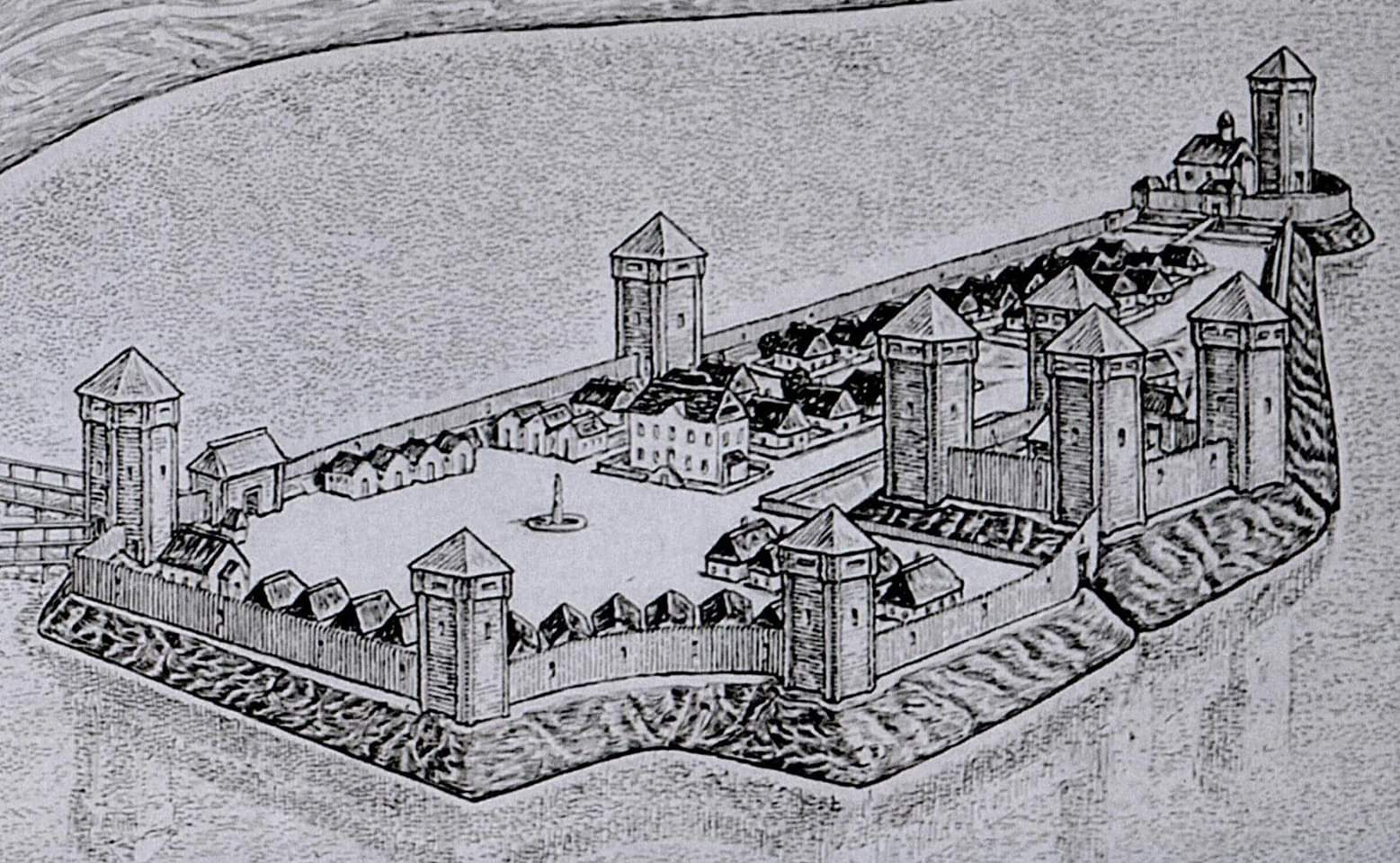
Reconstruction of the Płoskirów Castle

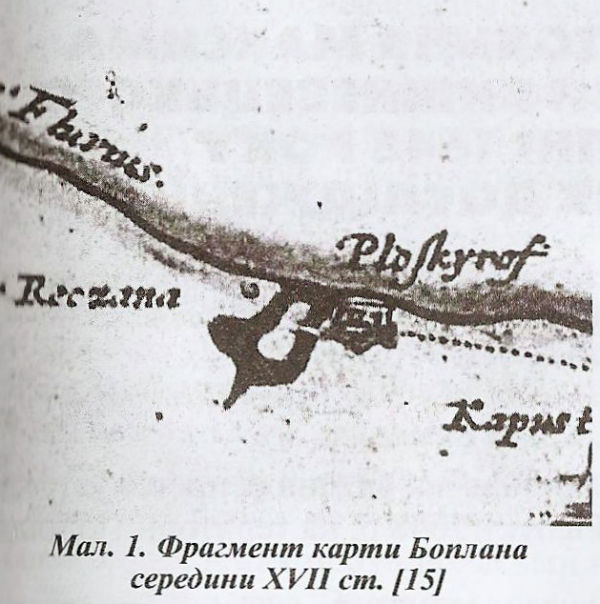
A fragment of Guillaume Le Vasseur de Beauplan's map mentioning Płoskirów in the 1600s.

After Włodek became the city's ruler, the population grew threefold, from 100 in 1541 to nearly 300 in 1569, according to estimates based on the voivodeship's tax register. By this point, there is already some evidence of a castle in the city, at least according to a royal property survey of starostwo of the Kaminiec notes that the residents of the small village of Trykhivtsi, as part of labour duties, were required to serve a castle in Płoskirów, among others. In 1566, thanks to the efforts of Włodek, Płoskirów was also granted Magdeburg rights, although this was only partially complete, as the city still remained under the authority of the starosta despite having its own town-hall administration. Włodek eventually died in 1570, and the estate was left to his son, Stanisław, who continued his father's efforts to improve the new city, with King Stefan Batory in 1578 granting Płoskirów a new privilege of hosting annual fairs in addition to its weekly Tuesday markets.

The founding of the Płoskirów Castle is, according to Yesyunin, dated to when Bernardo Morando, during his time as the engineer of Lwów in 1589, traveled to Płoskirów with Stanisław Szembek. Yesyunin claims that upon Morando visting, Włodek requested of his relative Jan Zamoyski (Włodek was married to Zamoyski's sister, Elżbieta Zamoyska), the then Hetman of the Polish-Lithuanian Commonwealth, that Morando help fortify Płoskirów also. This was apparently granted, and according to Yesyunin, Morando helped rebuild the old castle into the modern Płoskirów Castle, which was said to be designed in a grand stone bastion style that Morando had used at Zamość. However, this is contested, as Zakhar'yev argues that the castle was only ever described as small, and not a grand project. If anything, Zakhar'yev argues it was Stanisław himself who worked on rebuilding the castle by damming the Buh to turn the town into an island, and that Morando had minimal contributions to the actual project and instead just raised the earthen ramparts and erected a wooden palisade with towers. Either way, the oldest surviving subsequent eyewitness account of the town is dated to 1594 by Erich Lassota von Steblau, who was an envoy of Maximilian III of Austria. He described Płoskirów in this account as being situated on a lake that lay on the Boh that naturally divided the town in half.

== Khmelnytsky Uprising and destruction ==
In the early 1600s, the settlement came into dispute when Stanisław, with consent, transferred Płoskirów to Jan Potocki of Bracław, and after Potocki's soon death, his widow ceded it to Stanisław Lanckoroński of Podolia. Jakub Potocki, the brother of Jan, together with his cousins Mikołaj and Jan, formally protested this transfer, although Lanckoroński eventually just gave a large sum to the Potockis. Upon Lanckoroński's death, it was passed on to, rather notably, Stanisław Koniecpolski, who possessed the estate until 1646. Under his tenure, Płoskirów had its first Jews come to the city in 1627, and two years later the city was recorded as having 1,300 people (although this does not include the garrison stationed at Płoskirów Castle). In 1646, the estate was inherited by Aleksander-Michał Lubomirski, who ceded it to Koniecpolski's son, Aleksander Koniecpolski, who held the estate at the start of the Khmelnytsky Uprising. At the start of the uprising, in September 1648, the insurgent Cossack leader Maksym Kryvonis marched towards Pyliavtsi, and on the way stormed through the Płoskirów Castle and destroyed its garrison. A year later, another Cossack regiment under Danylo Nechai defeated the forces of Stanisław Lanckoroński (he is not the same estate holder mentioned earlier) outside Płoskirów. During this time, generally, the city changed hands multiple times between the Cossacks and Poles, and was completely devastated as a result of the fighting.

The devastation as a result of the uprising is attested to when, on 5 June 1661, Jan-Karol Belecki was granted permission to "re-settle Płoskirów" (implying it was depopulated). Other hints include a tax record that year, which refers to it being one of two settlements in the Podolian Voivodeship (alongside Płoskirivtsi) to be entirely devastated, and a 12 May 1662 royal document calls it a "devestated little town in the Podolian Voivodeship." However, in 1665, the town was visited by the new starosta (Marcin Zamoyski), and in this document, Płoskirów is described as having 12 households whose residents paid no tax because they had only recently settled there tax-free. Any progress made was undone during the Polish–Cossack–Tatar War (1666–1671), when the city was recorded as utterly destroyed by Tatars and Cossacks. Only two dilapidated huts remained standing in 1666 (according to statements by Ulrich von Werdum in 1671, more than 1,500 of Płoskirów's inhabitants had been "carried off" in a single raid prior).

== Ottoman rule ==
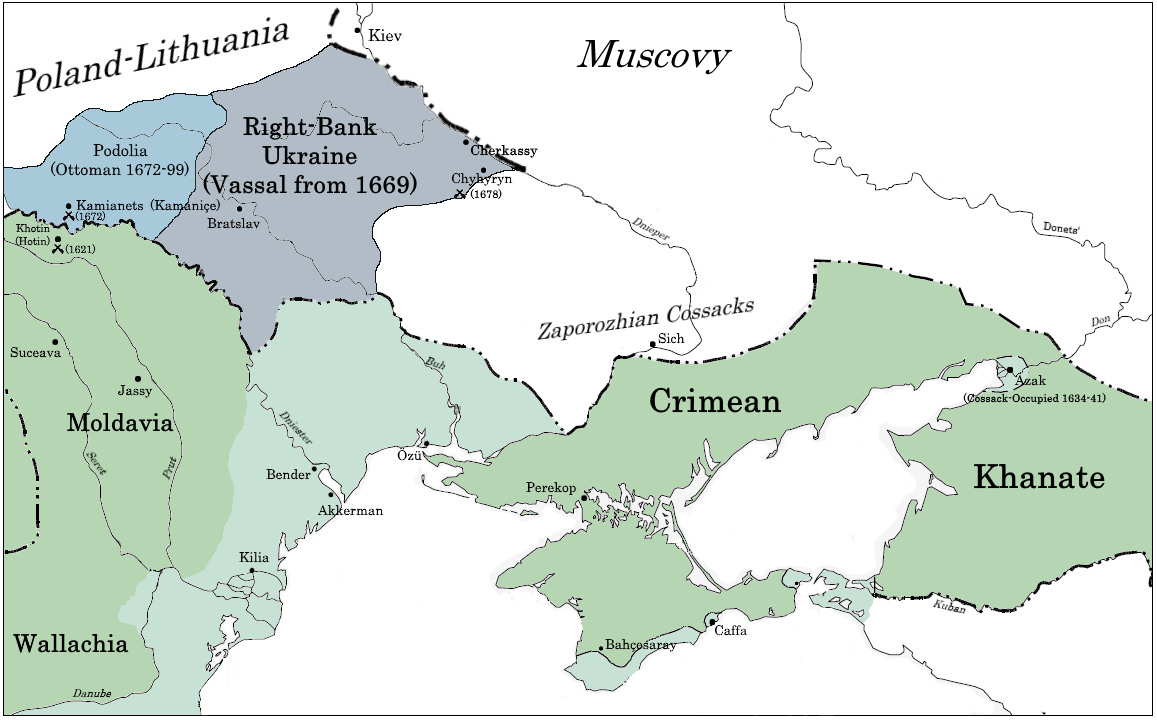
Ottoman territory in the 1600s. Podolia is on the far left.

As part of the Polish–Ottoman War (1672–1676), following the Siege of Kamenets, the territory of Podolia became a part of the Ottoman Empire, specifically within the Medzhybizh sanjak of the Podolia Eyalet. The territory was recorded as either "Poloskiruf" or "Poloskiruri". Either way, Poloskiruf had most of its inhabitants leave following the Ottoman seizure, with the Poloskiruf district of Medzhybizh (which, of course, included other towns) being listed as having just 306 people across 46 households. The dilapidated town itself, meanwhile, never recovered during Ottoman rule, although there are also no written Turkish sources mentioning Poloskiruf extensively during this time. The brief Ottoman rule ended in 1699 with the signing of the Treaty of Karlowitz, which concluded the Great Turkish War and returned Podolia to Polish rule.

== Late Polish rule ==
The legal starostwo, the Zamoyskis, came back to Płoskirów after 1699 and decided to resettle around 900 peasants, mostly from Mazovia and Masuria, to help the town recover. These descendants, who became known as the Mazurs, were the core of the population for a long time and also the main Catholic population. They lived mainly on the island part of the town known as Kemp, while the Jews lived on the mainland. The new settlers were also made temporarily exempt from taxes until Płoskirów could recover. During the subsequent failed Paliy uprising of the Cossacks against Polish rule, after the Polish army had already brutally suppressed parts of the uprising in the city, several Polish nobles still attacked the city. During the attack, they plundered parts of it and burned down the distillery, which led to a formal complaint being registered to the local court by the starosta Zamoyski, although it is not known the outcome of the case. Despite this, in June 1707, administrator Antoni Wiżkowski said that Zamoyski needed to end the tax-free license, as nothing was built properly and people were living in huts while others moved once they were rich enough.

During the War of the Polish Succession, Russian and Cossack troops briefly entered the region, and on 2 April plundered Płoskirów and its church and burnt down a granary. The city eventually recovered from this intrusion, and by the early 1740s there were 140 families living in Płoskirów. A later 1765 report put the population at just over a thousand inhabitants, 300 of whom were Jews. Most of the population were craftsmen, and there was a market square listed with a treasury and town hall. The city was particularly known for weavers at this time, who created unique carpets. In 1775, this was helped with the addition, by decree of Stanisław August Poniatowski, of two more annual fairs, each lasting two weeks. By the eve of the Russian annexation, the city still belonged to the Zamoyski family.

== Imperial Russian rule ==
=== Annexation and 1800s ===
Remains of the Płoskirów Castle on a map from the 1800s.

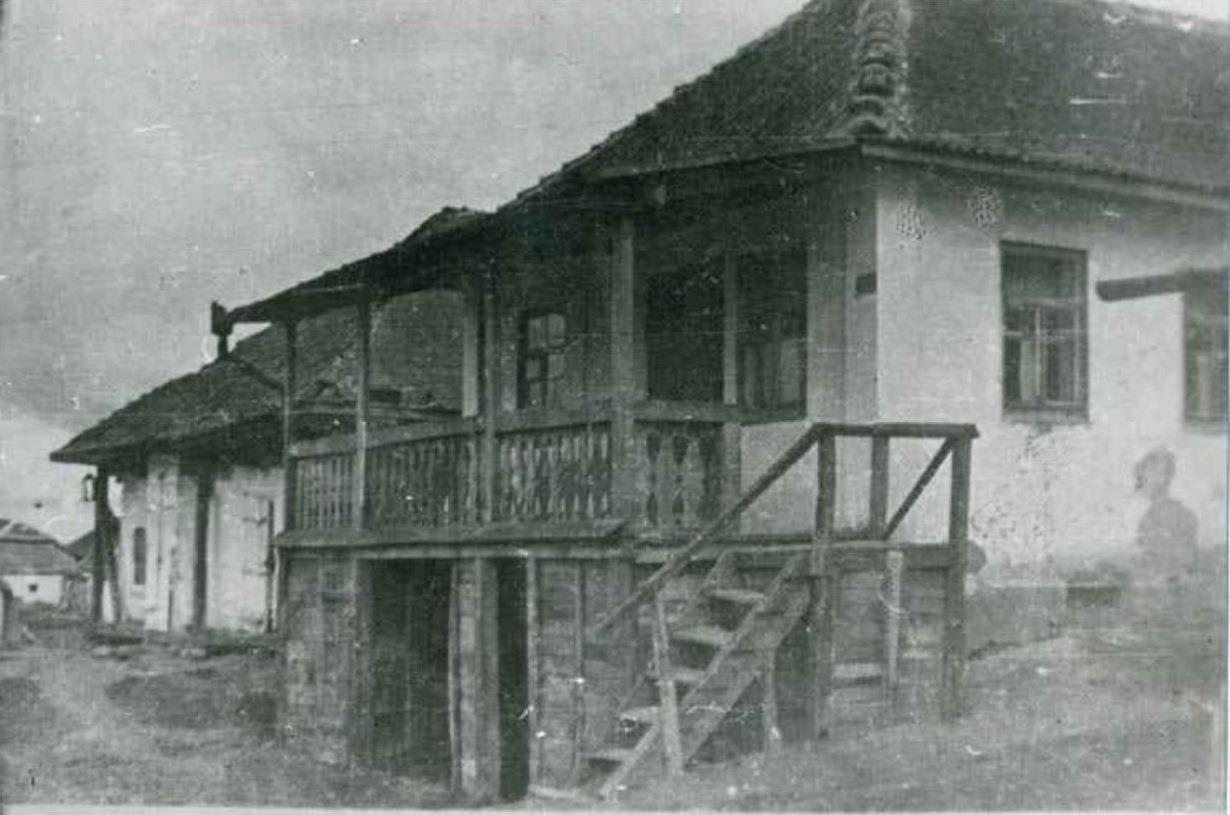
Jewish Quarters in the city in the early 1900s.

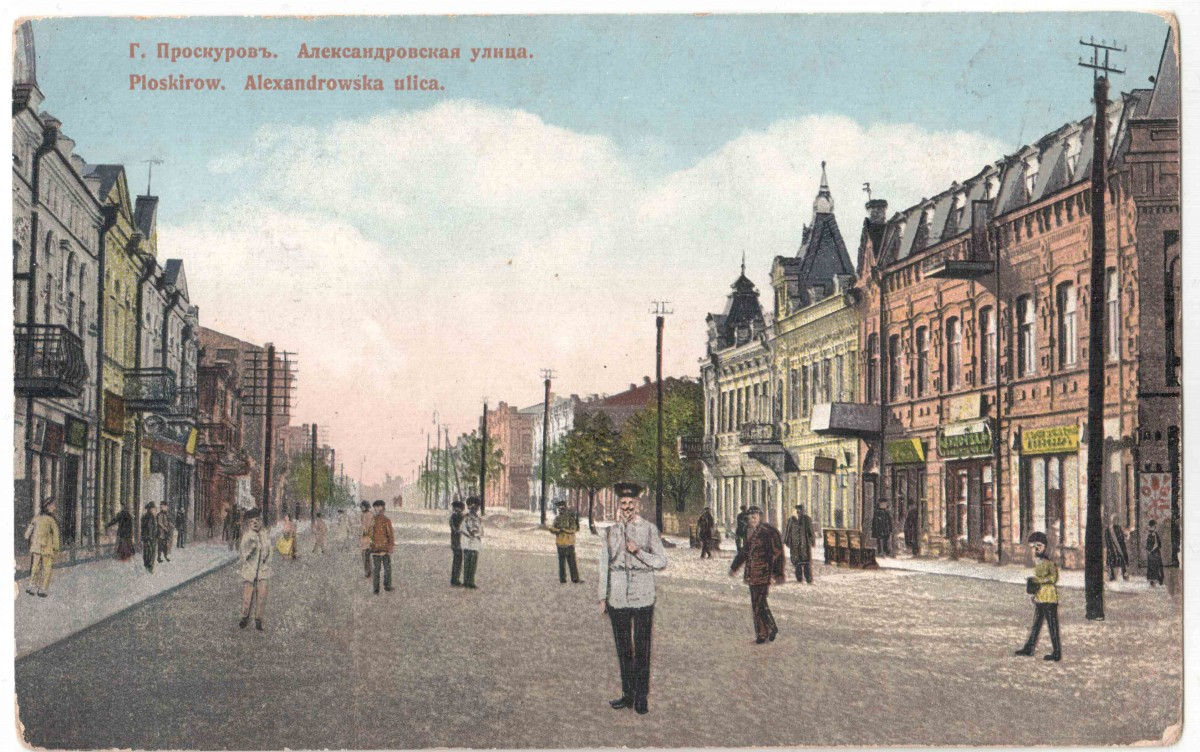
Postcard of Proskurov from the early 1900s.

After the Polish–Russian War of 1792, the Second Partition of Poland annexed the entire Podolian Voivodeship into the Russian Empire as the Podolia Governorate. Subsequently, after the creation of the Proskurov uezd in 1795, which is when the Polish Płoskirów fell out of use in favour of the Russian Proskurov/Proskuriv. The name Ploskyriv also coexisted at the time, but this was dropped when Proskurov was formally codified in 1801. The earliest city plan from the Russian era was in 1800, which showed two marked streets - Kamianets and Letychiv - and another topographic description showed that Proskurov laid on the right bank of the Buh. It had 68 wooden market stalls, a stone district treasury, and a small brewery with two mills. The population was about 2,000 residents. However, a fire in 1822 burned down most of the buildings which were wooden, as the only stone building was the treasury. After reconstruction, the 1824 general development plan continued with Kamianets/Kamianetska as the central street, although this would change in the late 1800s to Oleksandrivska, and also set out Khlibna Square as the main trading square, which hosted fairs and markets. The city's main economic output during this time was still farming, and it held large grain warehouses that was sort to the Port of Odesa, although there were also some industrial enterprises for cooperage, soap, candles, and tobacco. In 1869, a new two-class people's city school was opened to exist alongside the Jewish and parish schools.

It was only in 1870 that the small city started to rapidly industrialise and grow. This was the year that a new railway line opened up, connecting Proskuriv to Zhmerynka and Volochysk. The Proskuriv terminal station was built on a wasteland on the outskirts of the town via Oleksandrivska Street, becoming the first cobbled street in Proskuriv. In the aftermath of this decision, the city became militarily important again with the stationing of the 46th Dnieper Infantry Regiment in the city in September 1875 at the storehouses on Khlibna Square, and later in a barracks in Dubove. Later, the 35th Belgorod Dragoon Regiment was stationed in the city in 1889, the 12th and 19th artillery brigades in 1894, and the staff of the 12th cavalry and 12th infantry divisions in the early 1900s. In order to handle this influx of troops, two military towns were built specifically for the soldiers, alongside a regimental church. By 1884, the city had a distillery, a mead and beer brewery, four tobacco factories, three mills, two brickworks, two brick-and-tile works, and two tile works. The largest enterprise in the city was the Marants sugar plant, which was opened in 1891. Other large enterprises included a rubber stamp factory, the only one in Podolia, an egg and poultry trade, a foundry, a printing house, and a mineral water plant. The largest shipments were to Imperial Germany, and in the 1880s there was even the question of opening up a German consulate in the city due to how large the shipments were. That same decade, in January 1880, after municipal reform, a duma was introduced and an uprava, which was headed by the mayor. At the close of the 1800s, the official 1897 Russian census counted 22,855 residents in the city.

=== Early 1900s ===
By the early 1900s, Proskuriv had become the largest trading centre in the Podolia Governorate, with a total output of 5.5 million rubles, and its main trading institutions also served the surrounding areas. The banking institutions, such as the agencies of the Bessarabian-Tavrian and Kyiv land banks, Mozel and Son, and other offices, also opened up in the city in the early 1900s and were the second-largest in the governorate, behind Vinnytsia. The railway network also grew in the city with the opening of the joint-stock company "Podilska Railway" in 1909, which was managed in Proskuriv and built a freight station, locomotive depot, workshops, and a line to Shepetivka prior to 1917. Other additions made during this time were a telephone network (in 1909), widespread electricity with a 200 kW station (1911), the first library (1901), and a new theatre and cinema (1907 and 1909). Despite this, the city was still described as being generally wooden, with only the central streets having electric or gas lanterns, and the city was very unsanitary prior to an extensive cleanup effort under Mayor Henrykh Dubetskyi. To combat the unsanitariness, in 1909 a centralised water main was built with two wells, although it was only for the military.

During the Revolution of 1905, workers at the foundry and mechanical plants (which were bases for the RSDLP) struck, and the strike was backed by the tobacco factories and sugar-plant workers. A large demonstration was held in October, although most of these efforts were squashed, and the Bolshevik A.I. Hovorov was arrested. After the outbreak of World War I, as the city was already a military town, units of the 8th Army (who were housed at the Kompantsev house) and 7th Army Corps were quartered in the city. A large hospital was also opened up in the city for wounded soldiers at the front at the expense of Countess Binetska. A Jewish committee for war victims from the front also had a branch in the city, with Jews deported from Tarnoruda coming through the city. Eventually, with rumours of approaching forces during the Gorlice–Tarnów offensive in July 1915, in a panic many residents also left, although the city would never actually be taken.

== Soviet era ==
=== Russian Civil War ===
==== 1917 ====
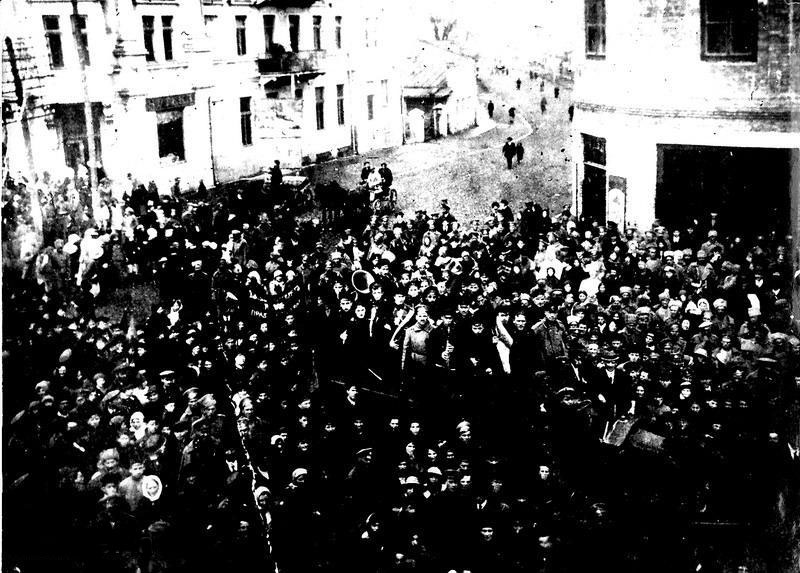
Rally in support of the February Revolution, 1917.

After the February Revolution and the Abdication of Nicholas II, Proskuriv would be highly receptive to the news, holding rallies and meetings. An organising committee for elections to a council was promptly set up by the workers of the industrial enterprises, which chose 153 deputies. The committee consisted of Mensheviks, SRs, Ukrainian nationalists, and Bolsheviks. A Council of Workers' and Soldiers' Deputies was also created in addition to this committee. Meanwhile, Ukrainian nationalists set up a Hromada society on 1 April, which helped sew Ukrainian flags and set up a choir to play the Ukrainian anthem, and a society of the Prosvita also formed. The Prosvita was founded on 18 April, with the council being elected that same day, although they only opened up their own building with a ceremony on 23 May.

Due to World War I still being waged, a Cossack detachment was sent to Proskuriv to persuade the units in the city (the 7th Army) to go to the front, although the Bolsheviks attempted to stop this. By the summer, the Bolsheviks had separated from the Mensheviks, which was confirmed by the South-Western Oblast Committee of the RSDLP(b), and their influence notably grew after the Kornilov affair. After the October Revolution, the Bolsheviks then seized power in the city. With the establishment of the Ukrainian People's Republic in response to this, Cossacks of the Central Rada, former members of the Provisional Government, and members of the 7th Army Committee attempted to seize power from the Bolsheviks. However, they were stopped by Red Guard units and revolutionary Finnish forces, who had been moved from Chornyi Ostriv. After this, the Bolsheviks firmly established power in the city under a military-revolutionary committee of the defected 7th Army.

==== 1918 ====
Austro-Hungarian troops in Proskuriv, 1918.

As part of Operation Faustschlag, a combined German and UPR force approached Volochysk in early February. The Bolsheviks, in turn, ordered the demolition of railway bridges and moved locomotives and wagons to Zhmerynka. However, they were eventually forced to retreat, and the Austro-German and UPR troops entered the city by the end of February. De jure UPR rule was eventually interrupted by the creation of the Ukrainian State (Hetmanate), which took power in April in Proskuriv. The Hetmanate severely restricted any meetings or gatherings on the streets and introduced a mandatory curfew. The city's duma and uprava were still allowed to be kept, with the duma being responsible for the militia and public order while the uprava was responsible for administration. The mayor at the time was M. Sikora, who was elected a duma member in the city in 1904. In early July, it was reported that railwaymen from Proskuriv refused to ship grain out, and later, according to Soviet-era sources, a train blew up at the station, killing at least 25 people. The Bolsheviks also continued their own underground at the time, in which they were said to send agitators to nearby villages and also sabotage railway lines and bridges. After the withdrawal of Austro-Hungarian and German troops in November 1918 following their defeat in World War I, the Directory took power in Podolia, replacing the Ukrainian State.

==== 1919 ====
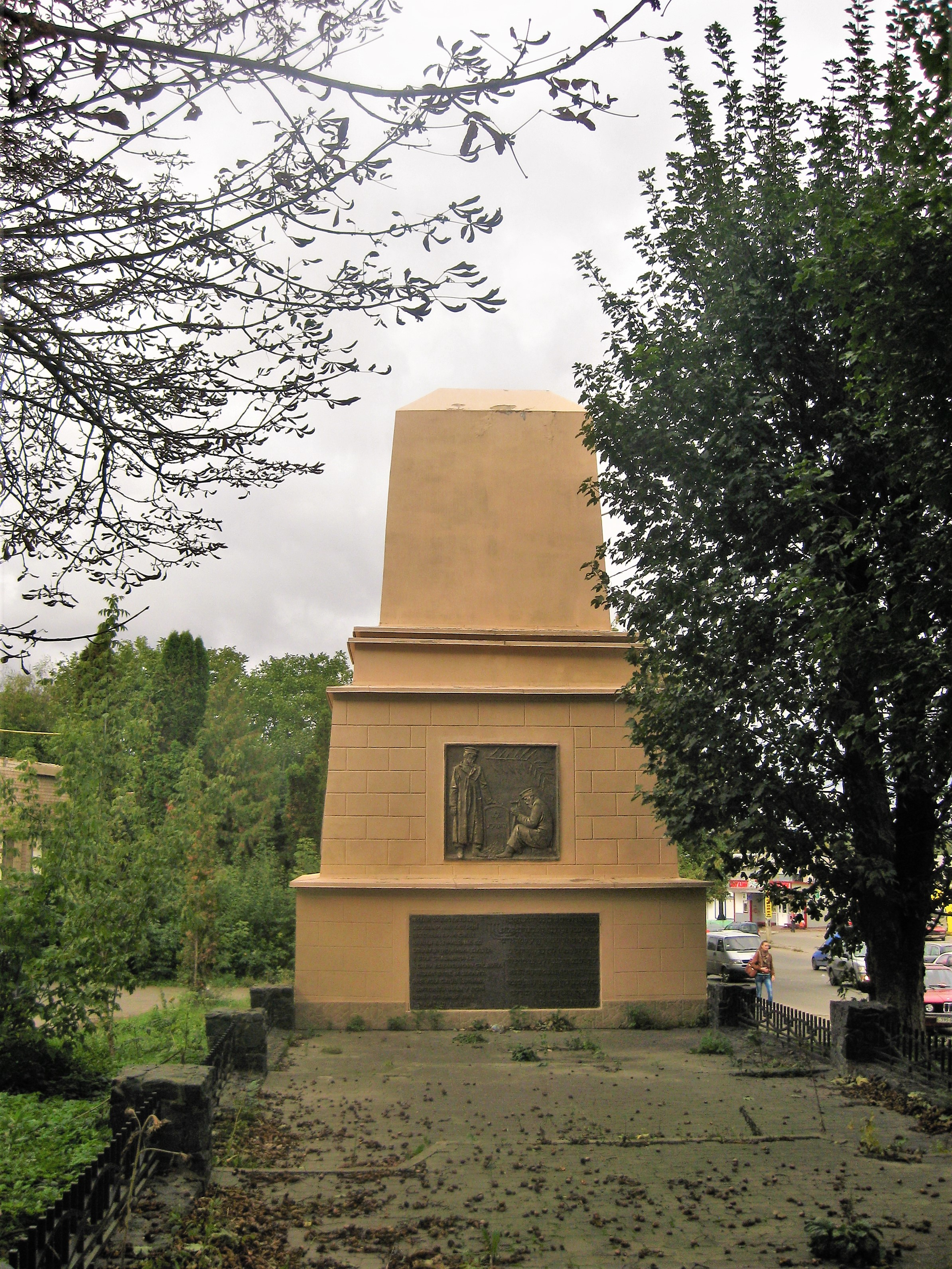
Monument and mass grave in honour of the victims of the Proskuriv Pogrom.

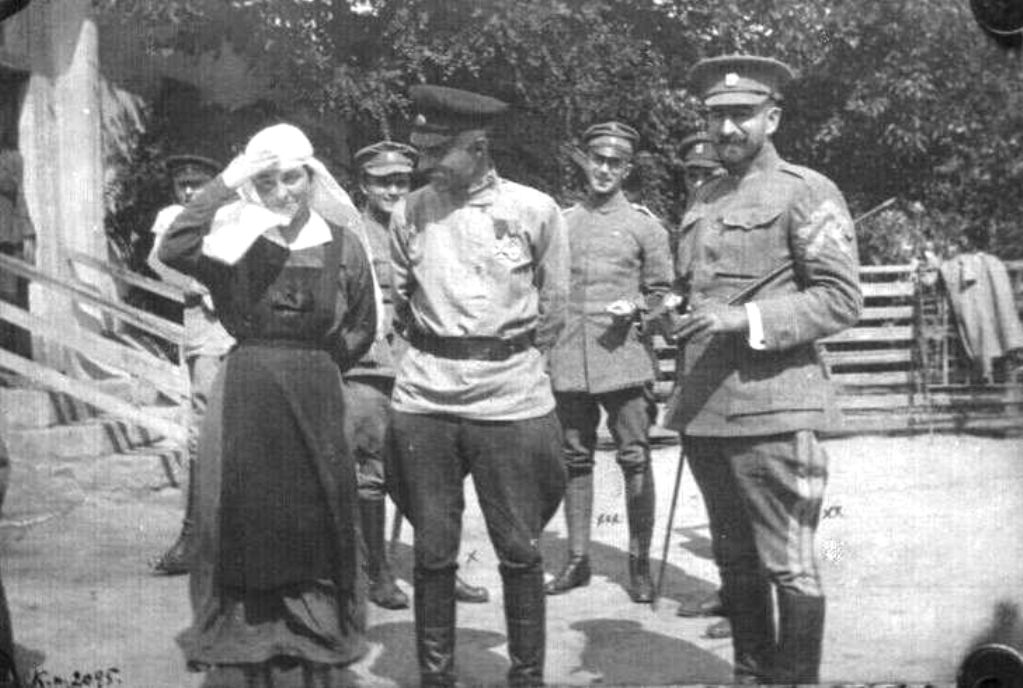
Petro Bolbochan (right) in the spring of 1918. In June 1919, he attempted a coup in the city, for which he was executed.

By 1919, martial law had already once again been declared at this time, and the Zaporozhian Cossack Brigade named after Symon Petliura and the 3rd Haidamaka Regiment were already stationed in the city and subordinate to Ivan Semesenko. On 10 February 1919, the Bolsheviks, under M. Tkachuk, ordered an uprising against the authorities in the city for the night of 14-15 February as part of a planned province-wide uprising. This was opposed by some other socialist parties, who feared a pogrom would be provoked if the uprising went ahead, but the Bolsheviks insisted on it. On the night of 15 February, the Bolsheviks managed to persuade the stationed 15th Bilhorod and 8th Podolia regiments to attack the loyalists of the UPR, but they were quickly suppressed. In total, the uprising lasted less than two hours. After the uprising, Semensko told his troops to kill Proskuriv's Jewish population, whom he blamed for the uprising, although they had minimal involvement in it. The soldiers then dispersed, going from home to home since it was Shabbat and many Jews were at home resting. After three hours, a telegram arrived from the Directory under commissar Taranovych, which ordered an end to the pogrom, which Semensko did, although he let his troops continue looting from the Jewish community for around 600,000 rubles. There are different estimates about the number dead during the pogrom, ranging from just over 1,000 to over 1,600 and close to 10% of the city's Jewish population. However, isolated killings of Jews would continue under Semensko, although the duma summoned him and ordered him to stop the violence, which he said he would do but did not. Sich Riflemen arrived about three days after 15 February, with its commander Yevhen Konovalets ordering an investigation into the pogrom. Afterwards, 2 million hryvnias were distributed to victims, while Semensko was arrested months later for unclear reasons.

The Sich Riflemen would end up stationed in the city for about a month in March 1919. During this time, the Directory's offices were briefly moved to Proskuriv from Vinnytsia and later Zhmerynka, thus making the city the de facto capital of the UPR for a short time. The city's theatre was used for Directory sessions during this time, and the city was where the last meeting of the Directory took place with full force. It was also the city where the "Proskuriv Declaration" was issued by the Riflemen, in which they affirmed the independence of the UPR but said they would support Soviet power if it was established. At the end of the month, the Riflemen left the city for the front, and the UPR offices were moved to Rivne. Thus, in April, a Bolshevik uprising by insurgents managed to take the city, and Bolshevik rule was formally established when the 2nd Ukrainian Soviet Army entered the city on either 6 or 10 April. The Bolsheviks then set up a revolutionary committee again, and 10 million rubles were levied from the "bourgeoisie". However, the garrisons stationed in the city were in poor condition according to Dmytro Shmidt, although the city held the staff of the 1st Ukrainian Division, Bohhun Regiment, and 21st and 22nd regiments.

In June, the UPR launched the Proskuriv offensive to seize the city from the Volochysk area, which they did on 6 June. The Zaporozhian Corps' 6th and 8th divisions, which attacked from the west and northwest, were pitted against the Red Guards, who had three armoured trains and a regiment of about 1,500 men. Fighting for the city on 6 June lasted little less than a day, with the UPR initiating by striking the city's railway station where the Cheka were, during which the Bolsheviks were forced to withdraw 30 km east to Medzhybizh. After the battle ended victoriously for the UPR, the Ukrainians captured a large amount of property, including 700 railcars and thirty field guns. Shortly after the city was taken, Petro Bolbochan, who had led the Crimea Operation, attempted to make an unsanctioned attempt to take over command of the Zaporozhian Corps, which failed. Bolbochan was later executed for the attempted coup. However, the surprise UPR offensive did not last long, as by 23 June the Bolsheviks concentrated near Moturynky. While the UPR was rotating units, the Bolsheviks suddenly struck in a surprise attack in nearby Bazaliia, during which the Volhynian Group could not hold back the Bolsheviks, while the 6th Division was too far east and the Sich Riflemen were short on ammunition. The Riflemen attempted to defend the city; however, on the night of 4-5 July, many of the rear units were evacuated after being wounded. The UPR decided to relocate to Kamianets-Podilskyi, and left behind Proskuriv, which was seized on 6 July 1919. The city was taken back by the UPR on 29 July, when Arnold Wolf's II Galician Corps entered the city after a two-day offensive. Shortly thereafter, the White Army took the city on 22 November 1919 from the UPR. The White Army, too, left the city after a few days due to Bolshevik pressure, and Polish insurgents, following the signing of the Treaty of Warsaw entered the city on 2 December 1919.

==== 1920 ====
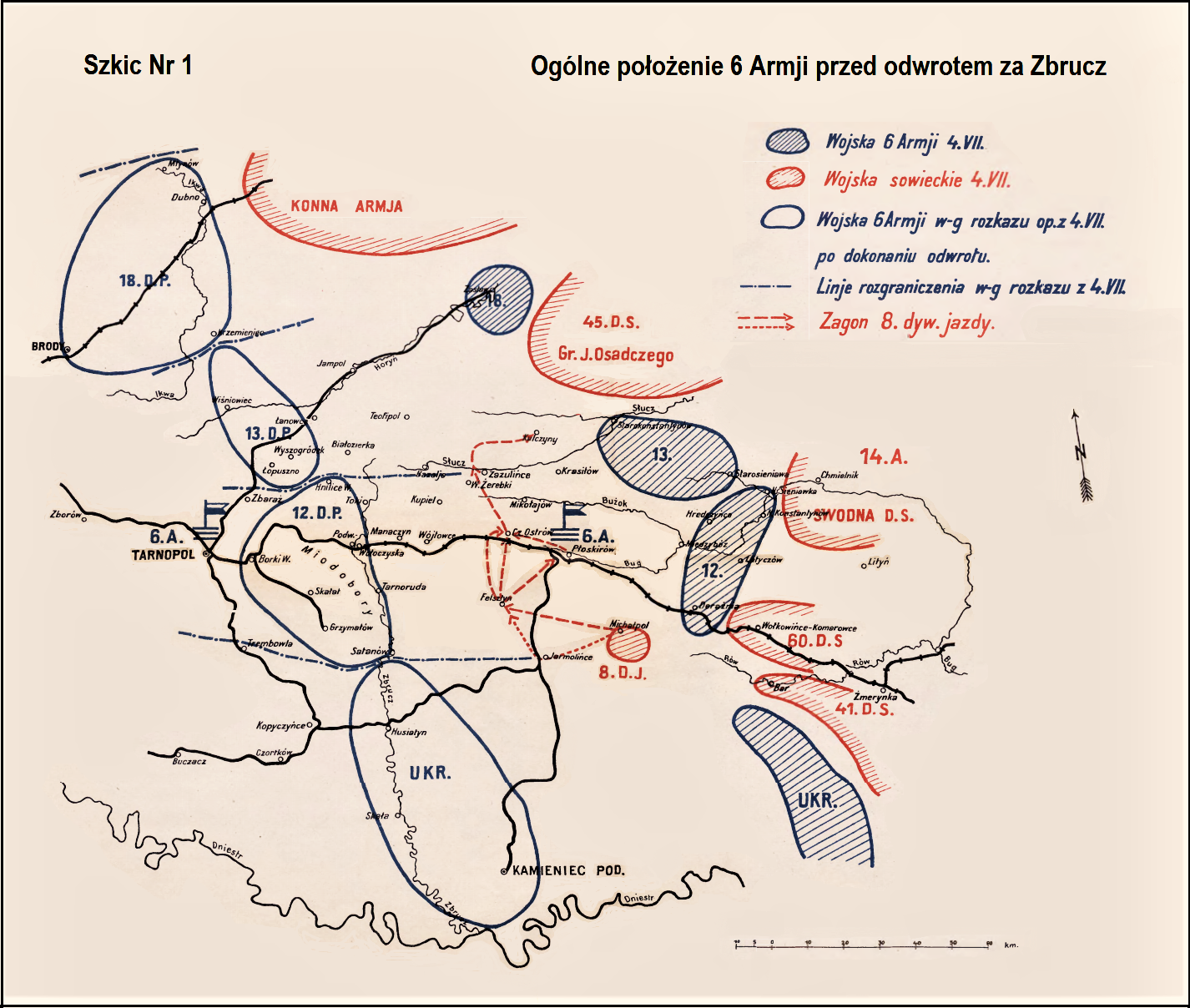
A Polish showing Proskuriv (labeled as Płoskirów) being the base of the Polish 6th Army in 1920.

Shortly after taking Poskuriv, the Polish authorities made the city into a military base, concentrating the 8th division, regiments of the 12th division, and cavalry units in the city. The Polish 6th Infantry Division was also later moved to the city. In the spring of 1920, a local Prosvita society was revived under Vasyl Mudryi, and after the Ukrainians returned to Podolia, the 4th Reserve Division of Kyiv was stationed in the city under Mykhailo Myshakiv, which had over a hundred men. Symon Petliura, the leader of the UPR, even visited the city that spring alongside Polish general Wacław Iwaszkiewicz-Rudoszański and other Ukrainian ministers, where he was met with a reception and a ball in the theatre. The last time the UPR would visit the city was in June 1920, and by the end of that month the Bolshevik Southwestern Front ordered the 14th Army to take the city to cut off the Ukrainians. On 1 July, the Poles fell back to Proskuriv from Kyiv, while they were surrounded by the 8th Cavalry Division, which was supported by armoured trains. The Ukrainians and Poles immediately evacuated, and on either 6 July or 9 July the 60th Rifle Division and 8th Red Cossack Division retook the city. The 8th Cavalry Division was stationed in the city until the end of September to protect it.

Eventually, the UPR and Poles mounted an offensive, and fighting for the city began again on 15 September. The main general in charge of the offensive was Ivan Omelianovych-Pavlenko, who crossed the Zbruch River on 24 September, with fighting continuing throughout 25 September. The Polish 6th Army would then again be stationed near the city as part of a defensive line. The Bolsheviks returned for a final time, and on 9 October, Alexander Yegorov ordered the capture of the city by 14 October under the 14th Army. A few weeks later, on 17 November, the Bolsheviks broke the Polish line thanks to Grigory Kotovsky and entered into battle with the UPR (the UPR's general was A. Zahorodsky), capturing the city on 18 November.

==== Maps ====
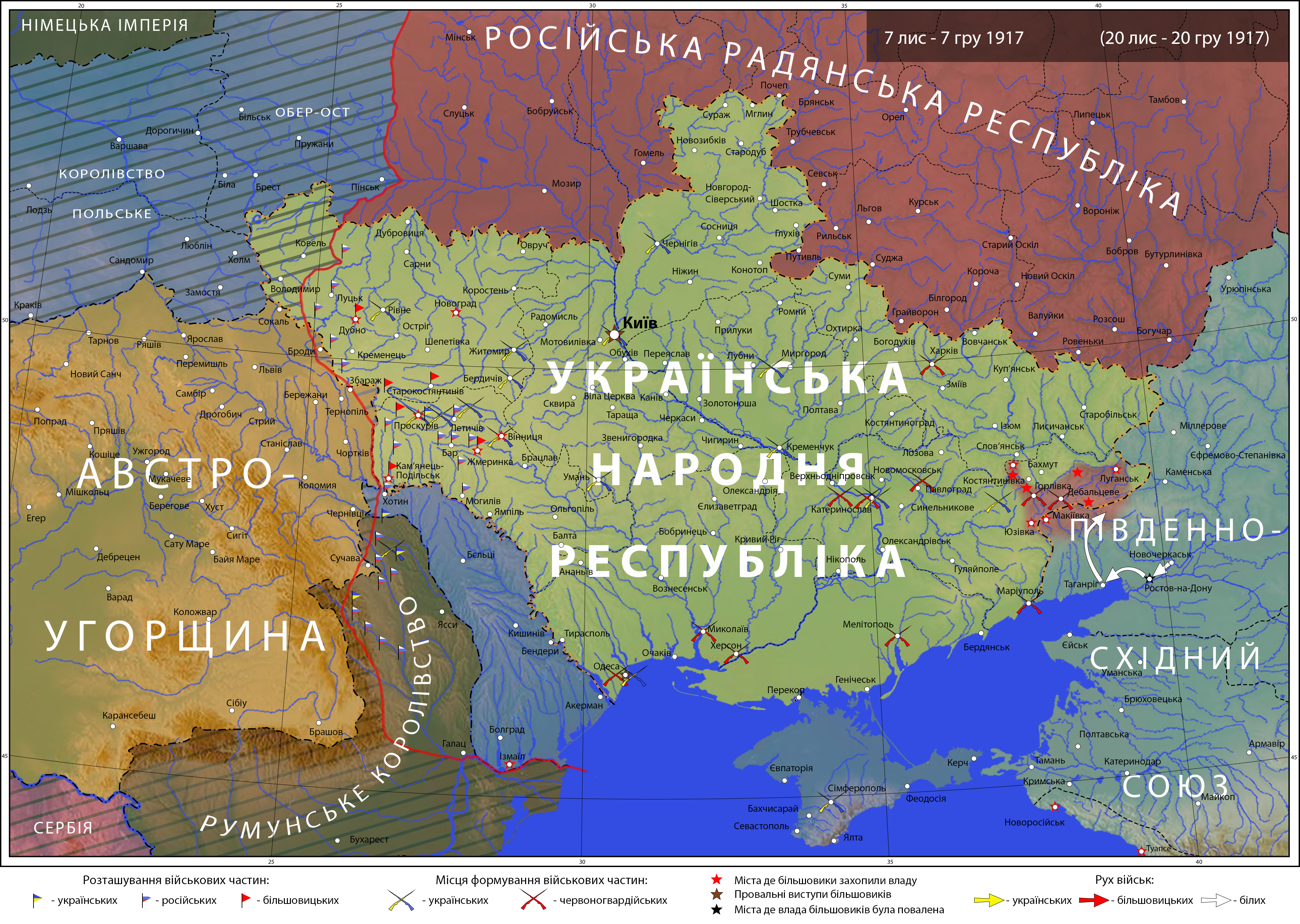
Situation in Ukraine from November to December 1917. The UPR has de jure power, but the Bolsheviks unexpectedly seize power.

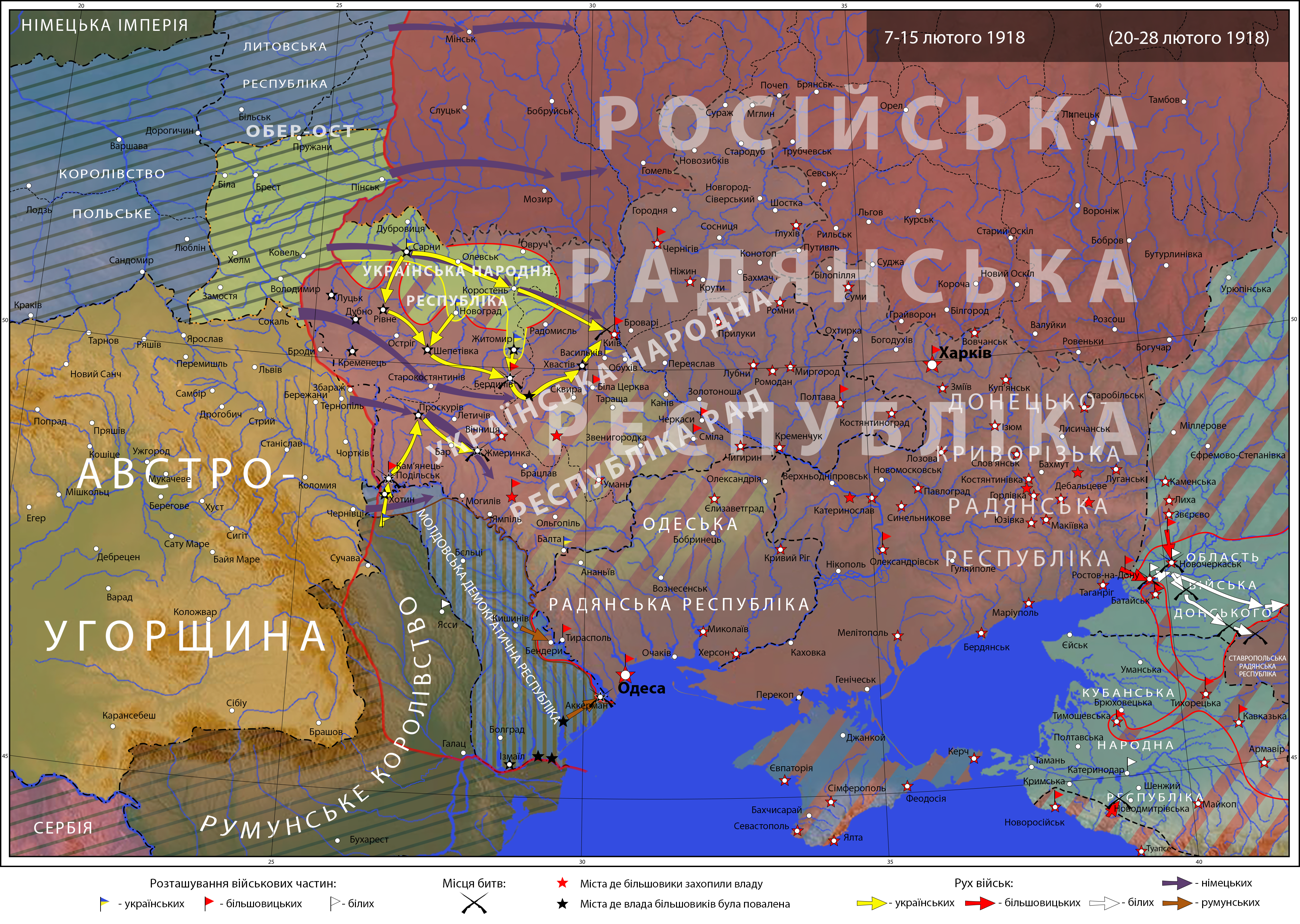
Situation in Ukraine from February 1918. The Bolsheviks have taken control of the city.

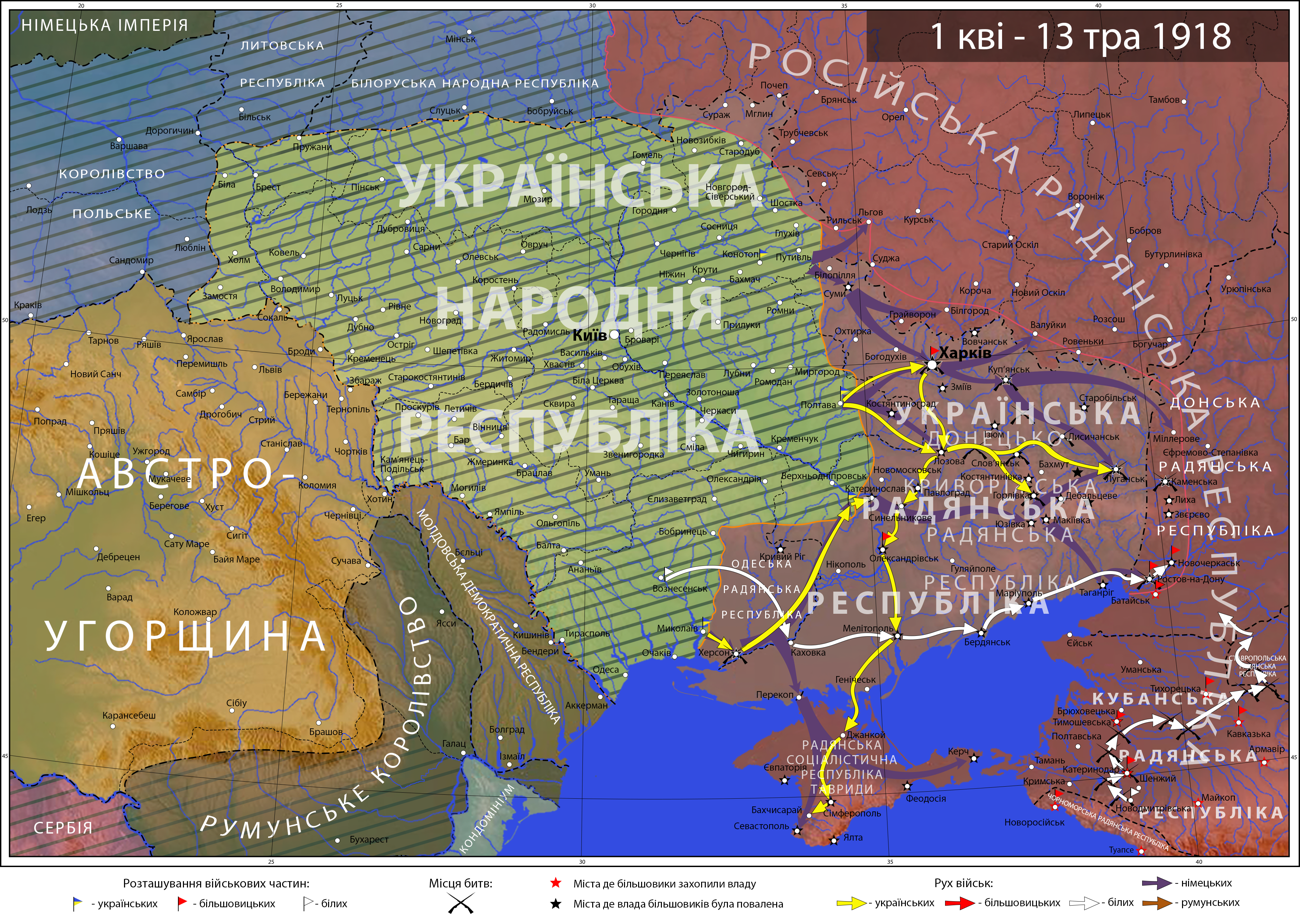
Situation in Ukraine from April to May 1918. The UPR, together with the Central Powers, retook Proskuriv.

Situation in Ukraine from May 1919. The Bolsheviks retake the city for a second time.

Situation in Ukraine from June-July 1919. A small UPR force briefly retakes the city for the third time.

Situation in Ukraine from December 1919. The UPR retains control of the city, although they are surrounded in a pocket during the Ukrainian Death Triangle.

Situation in Ukraine from July 1920. The Bolsheviks retake the city for the last time after a failed joint Pole-UPR defensive battle.

=== Interwar period ===
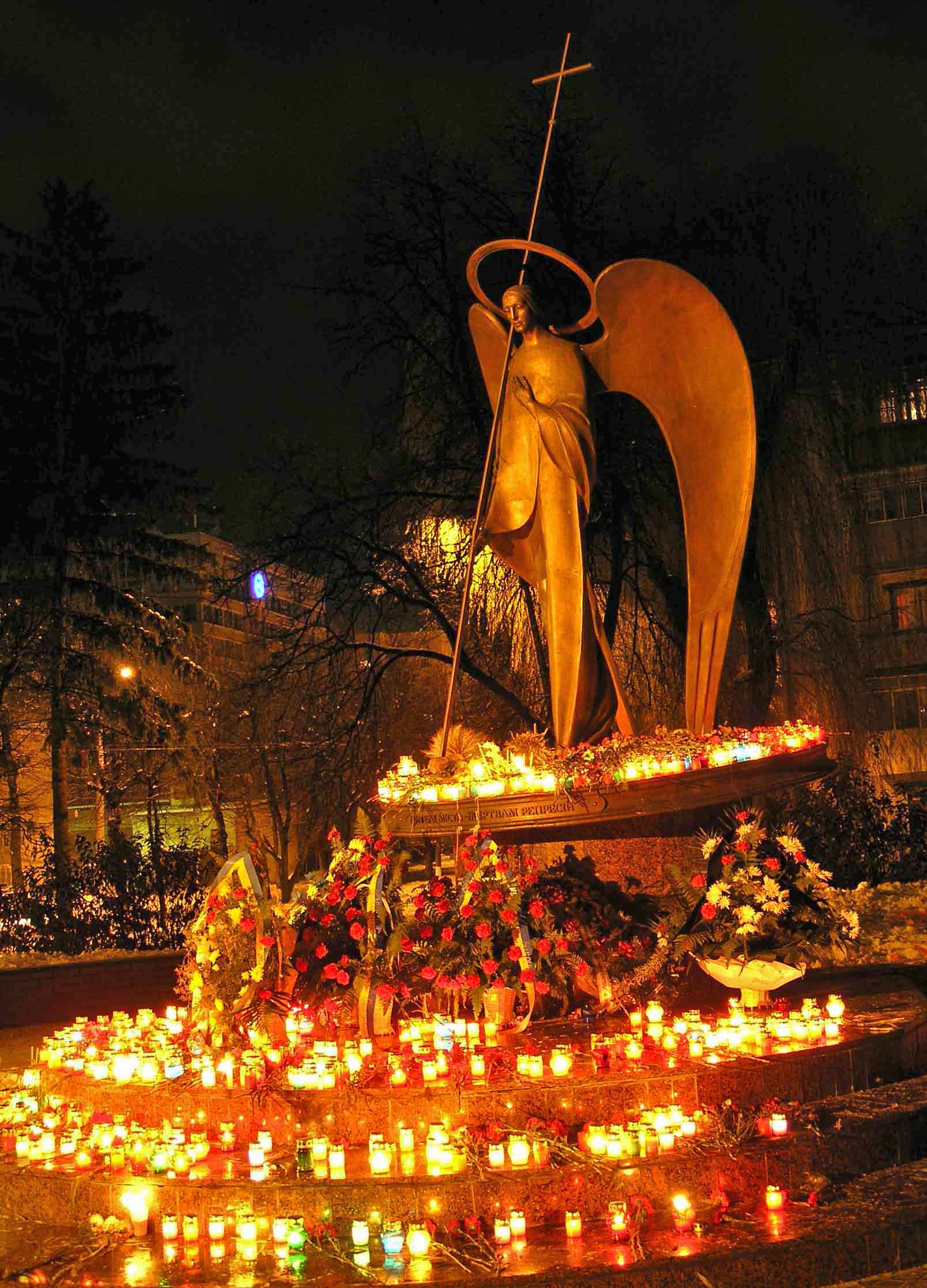
"Angel of Sorrow", a memorial to victims of Soviet repression.

After the Bolsheviks firmly established power in the city, a revkom was created in November of 1920, which nationalised the workshops in factories. After a year, the revkom was disbanded following the stabilisation of the situation, and power was handed over to an executive committee chaired by long-time Bolshevik I. Turchynskyi. In connection with this, under the New Economic Policy, some organisations were made into state combines (such as the distillery and brewery known as "Combine No. 3". However, at the same time, the city was hit by the 1921–1923 famine in Ukraine, which required a relief committee to be set up, while the city also took in people from more rural areas. After the famine, the city was made the centre of its own okruha, which had a party committee in the city. Proskuriv then underwent rapid industrialisation, with the prior sugar plant resuming production in 1924, and the woodworking factory and mills also beginning to operate again. By 1925, the city reached a pre-war industrial output level. Artisan artels also grew in the city at the same time as an illegal smuggling economy across the nearby border to the Second Polish Republic. Residents of Proskuriv would buy goods in Poland and then resell them in the east, like Kharkiv and the Donbas. Construction also started up again in 1925, such as the three-storey housing for party officials and the communal house, with a stadium, Kotsiubynskyi, Franko, and Pioneer parks also opening up during this time.

Culturally, the local Poles under Korenizatsiia had a Polish village council created in the village of Hrechany as part of the Polish National District project. In the area of religion, the city was heavily restricted, with the Cathedral of the Nativity of the Virgin being shut down alongside the Catholic church and the Great Synagogue. The very last church, the cemetery Pokrova church, was closed in 1938. Lastly, during the Great Terror, initially only about 120 workers and staff at the Kuibyshev mechanical plant were killed in 1937. However, the NKVD arrived in the city shortly thereafter and created a special department of the NKVD of the 5th Cavalry Group. The NKVD then shot around 2,060 people in just Proskuriv.

=== World War II ===
==== Battle of Proskuriv ====
After the start of Operation Barbarossa, mobilisation immediately began on 23 June 1941, with most local factories switching to provide for wartime services. Evacuations to the east also immediately began, although at the start equipment was mostly prioritised over evacuating people. In the city itself, the House of the Red Army briefly hosted a command centre under Mikhail Kirponos until 30 June, when it was decided to move the command to a more fortified area. It was then intended that the city would be part of a defensive line, but nothing came of this since there was no real organised defense of the city itself. Instead, before the Soviets eventually evacuated following rapid German advances, they demolished important buildings: the power plant, NKVD archives, the railway station, and some factories. After the Soviets left, there was a brief period of no command, with looting becoming frequent until the Germans finally arrived on 8 July 1941 and the city was captured by members of the 1st Mountain Division who had recently also captured Lviv.

==== Occupation of Proskuriv ====
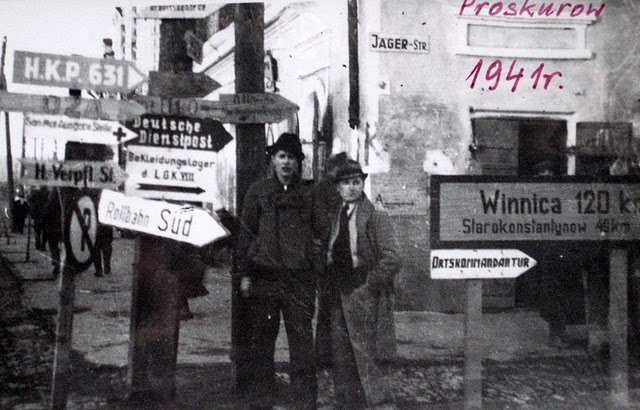
Proskuriv under occupation in 1941.

Memorial sign in honour of the partisan underground (since dismantled).

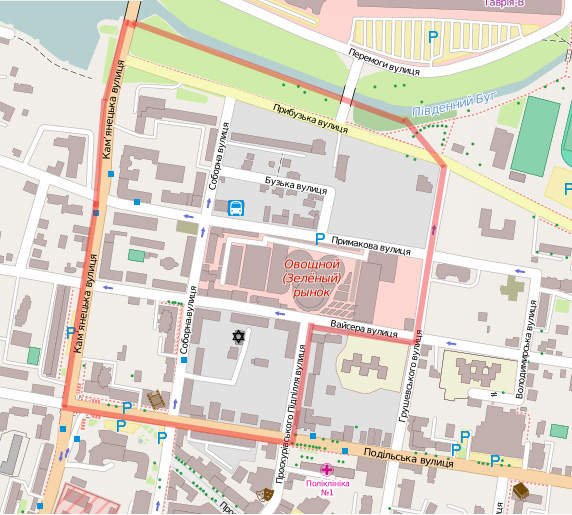
Approximate location of the Proskuriv Ghetto on a modern-day map.

Mass grave of Holocaust victims

After the formation of Reichskommissariat Ukraine, the occupied city was then made the administrative centre of the Proskuriv gebit (district) of the Wolhynien und Podolien okrug. The Gebietskommissariat for the district was housed in the military headquarters of the House of the Red Army. Administratively, the German officials held all the high positions, although a Ukrainian self-government was subordinated to them. During the occupation, the main street of Proskurivska was renamed to Goeringstrasse in honour of Hermann Goering, while Podilska Street was renamed to Jägerstrasse in honour of the soldiers who captured the city. The Germans then paved parts of the city, restored the blown-up power plant, and repaired housing and barracks for German use. However, Ukrainians weren't allowed to attend areas together with the Germans, and free trade was prohibited. Religion in the city was set up again, although the Germans heavily interfered in the church's affairs.

Starting in 1942, the Germans began deporting people in the city for forced labour. The recruitment point was at School No. 7, with the occupation newspaper Ukrainskyi Holos reprinting recruitment appeals to the city. Around 1,300 people in total were deported to Germany for labour. Around the same time, a prisoner of war camp known as Stalag 355 was set up in the Rakove suburb in January 1942, which ran in the city until November 1943. According to the testimony of a camp doctor at the Nuremberg Trials, the prisoners there were routinely beaten, and isolation and quarantine cells were common. The daily mortality rate at the camp reached around 700 to 950 people dead a day, with estimates of the number dead at the camp going from 60,000 to about 65,000. According to Soviet-era sources, including the deaths at Stalag 355, around 81,000 civilians were killed in Proskuriv during the occupation.

===== Partisan underground =====
Starting in September 1941, a partisan underground of several former groups was united under M.A. Khranovsky. There were also small cells at the railway station, sugar plant, and woodworking factory, although by 1942 more workers joined in. The underground first destroyed locomotives in the autumn of 1941 before starting to publish leaflets in 1942 called "An Appeal to the Population", which was followed up by later leaflets on the state of the Battle of Stalingrad and conditions of forced labourers. Other activities that have been claimed included making forged stamps, helping people avoid deportation, and helping prisoners of war escape. However, on 15 April 1943, one of the partisans was killed, which led the Gestapo to find many other members and kill them. Around 350 partisans then left for the forests as part of a "People's Avenger" detachment, although one in Hrechany and one within the city itself still operated.

===== Holocaust =====
Just before the occupation, in 1939, the Jewish population of the city was 14,518 people, which was nearly 39% of the population. Shortly after the start of Operation Barbarossa, some Jews from the more western parts of Ukraine arrived in the city, hoping to flee. Once the Germans occupied the city, they immediately shot a group of Jewish men at the city's wells, then immediately ordered all Jews to be registered, hand over their valuables, and wear yellow badges. Under the orders of Gebietskommissar Schmerbeck, Jews were moved to a ghetto in the market area in either September or on 14 December 1941, with a Judenrat being appointed for the Proskuriv ghetto. The ghetto had a fence of barbed wire surrounding it, with guard towers manned by soldiers with machine guns, while property of the Jews was stored in a kintwear factory. A labour ghetto was also created in Leznevo, where certain Jews were selected to repair the highways that had been destroyed.

On 4 November 1941, around 5,300 Jews were murdered by the Germans under the supervision of Einsatzgruppen and SD officers as part of the Holocaust. After the initial November massacres, the ghetto was divided into an old ghetto for regular citizens and another for skilled workers. Jews were then brought in from Mykolaiv, Chornyi Ostriv, and Feldshtyn. More shootings of the labour-camp prisoners followed in late November. Following these shootings, over a period of a week, the remaining prisoners at the ghetto were shot until the city was declared judenfrei by the Germans. Shootings were said to have mainly taken place 500-600 m from the Leznevo ghetto, near what was then a dump, and at the Leznevo fruit-drying factory. In total, during the occupation, 9,500 Jews were killed in the city, in addition to around 800 brought in from Mykolaiv and 1,172 from Chornyi Ostriv. The following people from Proskuriv are listed as Righteous Among the Nations for helping Jews during the occupation: Maria Havlavska, the Shershun family, Yevelina Larionova, and Liudvyha Pukas.

==== Liberation of Proskuriv ====
Monument of Eternal Glory

By around the middle of March 1944, the front had reached the city near Buzhok River. In preparation, the Germans had dug minefields and brought in army-groups to defend mostly the railway line. On 24 March, the Soviet Army finally attacked the city, with the 304th Rifle Division quickly taking Leznevo, the 127th Division Hrechany, and the 2nd Airborne Division Ruzhychna. After the satellite villages were retaken, the 107th Rifle Division led the line, attacking the railway station, which they seized, and the airfield. The 2nd Airborne Division then came in from Ruzhychna to seize the centre of the city, although fighting would last for another day until 25 March 1944, when the city was finally liberated. Fighting within the city itself was not heavy, as the Germans decided to retreat, fearing encirclement. In total, 1,700 German troops were killed during the fighting for the city, with the Germans also losing 15 tanks, 38 guns, and 1,060 vehicles. The Soviets lost 3,252 soldiers. In total, 24 units were given the honourific title of "Proskurivski", while British writer James Aldridge (who was a war correspondent) witnessed and wrote about the liberation of the city.

=== Postwar ===
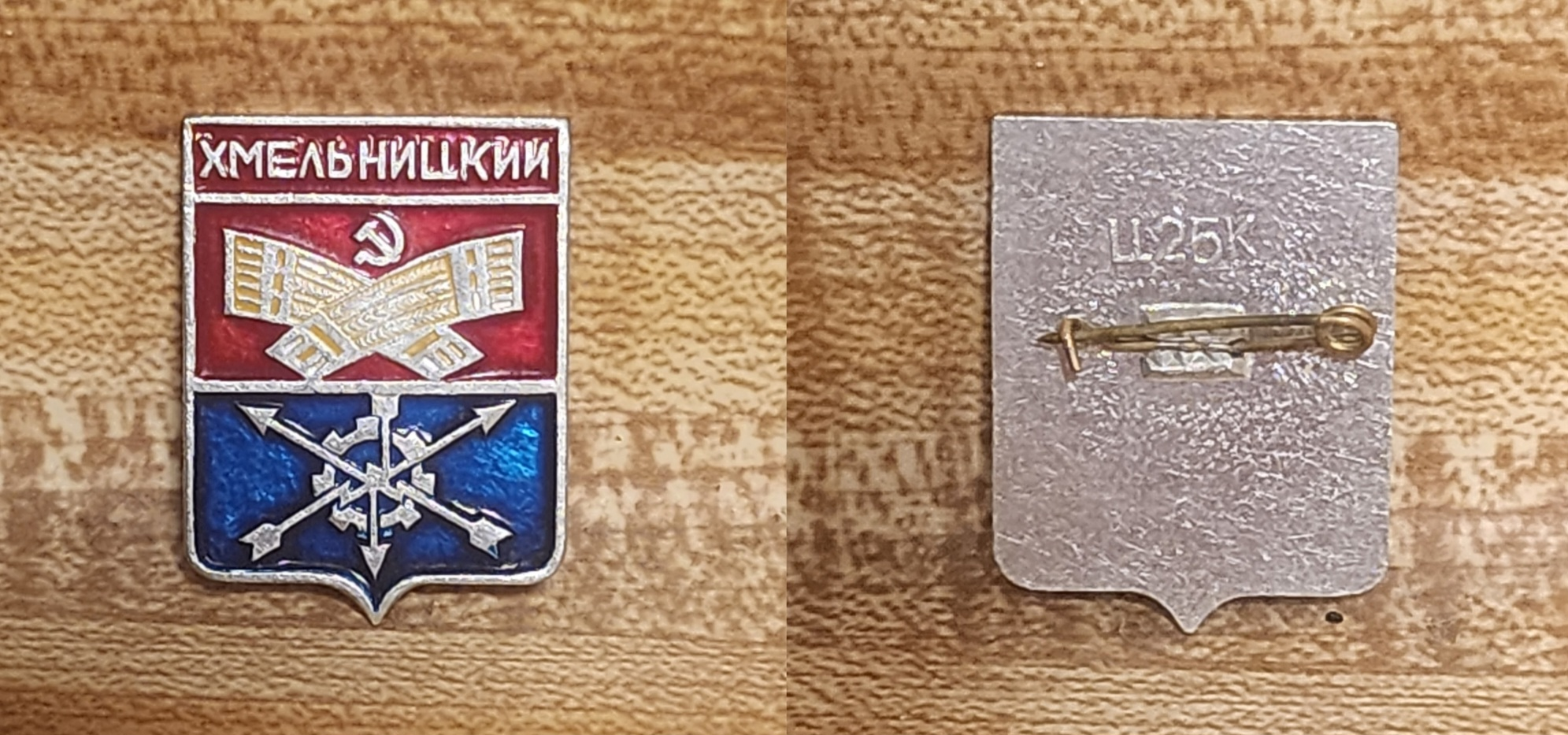
Mass-produced Soviet-era badge from Khmelnytskyi.

View of Khmelnytskyi with Soviet-era apartment blocks.

Following the liberation of the city, Soviet-era sources estimated that the damage to the city was around 83 million rubles, with most of the factories being evacuated or destroyed and the buildings also destroyed. The first enterprise to be brought up and running was the railway station, with the power station then being restored alongside the brewery, meat, and poultry plants. The fourth five-year plan then started, which led to output returning to pre-war levels. Culturally, the Petrovsky theatre also was returned along with the Philharmonic, while the Chkalov Cinema had to be rebuilt, and a new Joseph Stalin monument was erected, although it was destroyed during de-Stalinization. A new park called the Komsomol Park and later the 50th Anniversary of October Park was also constructed between 1948-52 alongside the Dynamo stadium. On 16 January 1954, the city was renamed from the long-used Proskuriv following Russian annexation to Khmelnytskyi after Bohdan Khmelnytskyi during the celebrations for the Union of Russia and Ukraine Tercentenary. As part of the anniversary, new postcards for the city by Mystetstvo were also made. After this, industrial growth continued due to the first secretary, Andriy Shokhanov, and executive committee chairman, Kostiantyn Karlov, heavily pushing for it, with them arguing that investment should be brought to the city over the largely funded Vinnytsia at the time. A new substation plant, machine plant, and reinforced-concrete plant were then opened alongside Traktorodetal. The city's boundaries also grew with the small satellite villages of Leznevo being transferred to the city (1962) and Ruzhychna (1981).

In 1956, the 17th Guards Motor Rifle Division was transferred to the city, which created a new microdistrict at the former tanker's barracks. This was followed by the 19th Zaporizhzhian Missile Division of the 43rd Rocket Army of the Soviet Strategic Rocket Forces during the Cold War, who were stationed in Rakove. Following the stationing of the 19th, Khmelnytskyi held intercontinental ballistic missiles (specifically UR-100s). A 50th Division was also stationed in the city starting in 1972, when parts of the 17th Division were redeployed to Hungary. That same year, the Khmelnytskyi Higher Artillery Command School was founded. The other higher-level school in the city was the Ukrainian Polygraphic Institute, which first opened in 1962. Prior to 1962, Khmelnytskyi was the only oblast centre in Ukraine without a higher-level university.

== In an independent Ukraine ==
=== 1990s to early 2010s ===
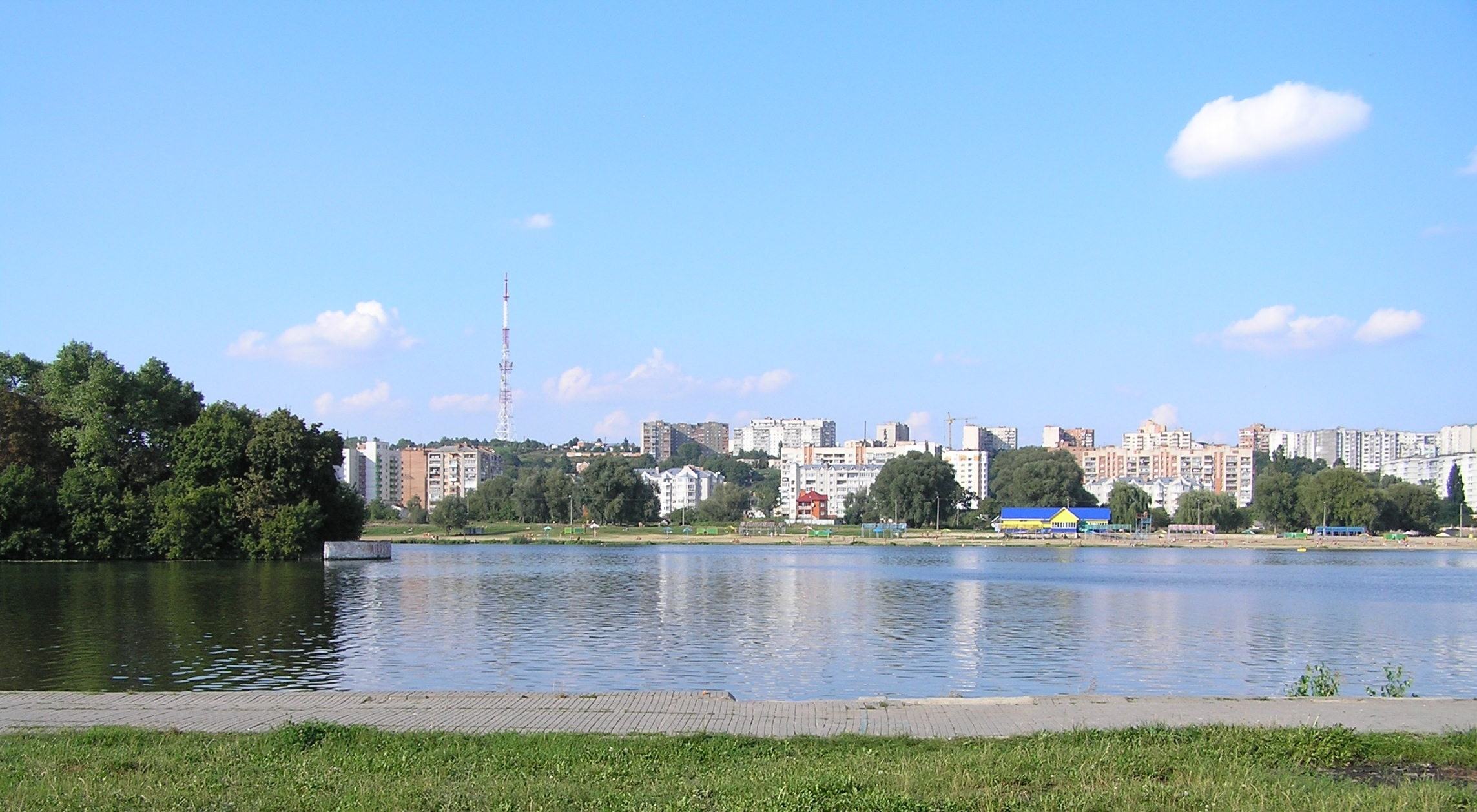
Khmelnytskyi in the summer of 2007.

Following the collapse of the Soviet Union, the city became a part of an independent Ukraine. Following independence, Khmelnytskyi became one of the first in Ukraine to decommunise its streets, and a monument and memorial sign of Taras Shevchenko were set up. As part of the transition to a market economy, some industries began to lay off workers, although in the end Khmelnytskyi fared better because of the construction of bazaars and large shopping centres. More educational institutes also started to open up, including the Khmelnytskyi University of Management and Law, Bohdan Khmelnytskyi National Academy of the State Border Service of Ukraine, and a private institute of business, making 13 new universities in the city in the 1990s. In 1993, President Leonid Kravchuk visited Khmelnytskyi to learn about the status of the ICBMs (the UR-100s, also called SS-19s by NATO), with other Russian and American officials also visiting as part of funding from the Nunn–Lugar Cooperative Threat Reduction to remove missiles in independent Ukraine. In turn, the Americans also funded 195 apartments for officers and their families in Khmelnytskyi, creating a new microdistrict. The 10 UR-100s were deactivated starting in the spring of 1996, with the Donetsk firm Shahspecstroy carrying out silo blasting and another Ukrainian firm Stroom RITIE tasked with dismantling the sites under contract. Throughout the 2000s, the main economic employer of Khmelnytskyi continued to be the clothing markets. In lieu of this, large projects started, including the construction of a trade and service centre and the monument to victims of the Chornobyl disaster.

=== Euromaidan ===
Euromaidan protestors at Independence Square in December 2013.

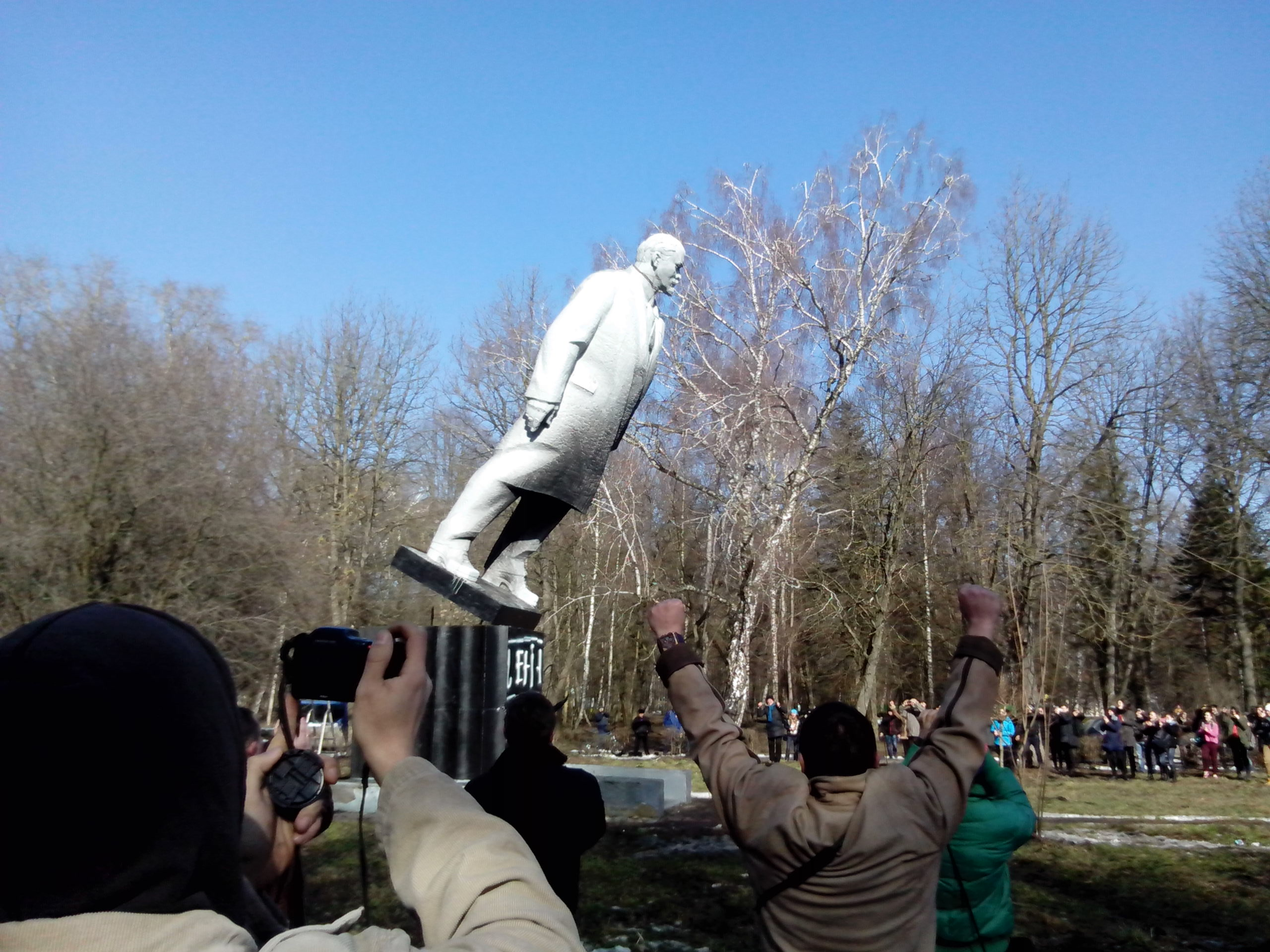
The toppling of a Lenin statue in Khmelnytskyi in February 2014.

Euromaidan protests in the city first began on 22 November 2013, with around a hundred people at Independence Square, with some tents already being pitched that day by activists from Svoboda near the "Faith, Hope, Love" monument. The number tripled by 24 November, while others went to go to the central protests in Kyiv. Following this, Anti-Maidan also began to set up tents and distribute newspapers. By early January 2014, representatives of Batkivshchyna said they would apply for membership in the "Maidan" organisation, and protestors first began to block the Khmelnytskyi Oblast Council building (or OBA building) on 20 January. With the increased protests, on 23 January 2014, the city council adopted a resolution for the disbandment of the local Berkut unit, repealing the so-called "dictator laws", the resignation of Mykola Azarov's government, and early elections to take place. On that same day, around 1,000 people blockaded the OBA building with tyres and bags.

Protests severely escalated on 24 January, in light of the ones in Kyiv, when over 7,000 people rallied at Independence Square, calling for the oblast council to take similar measures to the city council and for members of the Party of Regions to leave the party. After the oblast session did not adopt the appeals, protesters entered the House of Councils, breaking through the police barricade and reaching the second floor. Following the clashes, the deputies of the oblast council voted nearly unanimously in favour of the resolutions. However, protesters then demanded that president-appointed governor Vasyl Yadukha resign, and some people attempted to storm his office until members of the special-police unit Hryfon released tear gas after they claimed one officer was beaten by protesters. One of the commandants of Maidan in the city, Yurii Smal, was then allowed to negotiate with the oblast leadership, with protestors being promised that the governor would resign, after which they left and returned to Independence Square. A few weeks later, on 19 February, protestors gathered at the local branch of the Security Service of Ukraine to meet with the head, until some people tried to forcibly enter the building using trolleybuses. The SBU officers then shot into the crowd, wounding five or six over the day and killing one person immediately, Dmytro Pahor. Another, Liudmyla Sheremet, was initially seriously wounded and died three days later. The head of the local SBU, Viktor Kraitor, was later detained in connection with the incident, and a criminal case was opened against him.

=== Recovery ===
Stamp of Khmelnytskyi from 2017.

In 2015, in a survey rating of most of the oblast centres of Ukraine by the International Republican Institute, Khmelnytskyi placed seventh overall in quality of life. It scored highest in industrialisation (second) and condition of roads (third). Although many other cities saw a reduction in population, Khmelnytskyi instead saw a growth in its population based on estimates from January 2022, before the war, thanks to internal migration. On 17 July 2020, as part of administrative reforms under Volodymyr Zelenskyy, the Verkhovna Rada passed a law by which Khmelnytskyi lost its designation as a city of regional significance (the system was abolished nationwide), which meant the city was incorporated into the newly-formed Khmelnytskyi Raion as its administrative centre alongside also being the administrative centre of the Khmelnytskyi urban hromada. That same year, as part of the COVID-19 pandemic in Ukraine, Khelmnytskyi saw its first case in the city as confirmed by lab testing, on 27 March 2020. The number grew to 43 by June 2020, although it drastically increased in the autumn of 2020 to nearly 3,276 total cases and 65 deaths. Khmelnytskyi was eventually placed into an red zone as part of the epidemic's classification in October 2021, alongside other oblasts like Kyiv and Zhytomyr. This was downgraded to one level down, orange, in January of 2022.

=== Russian invasion of Ukraine ===
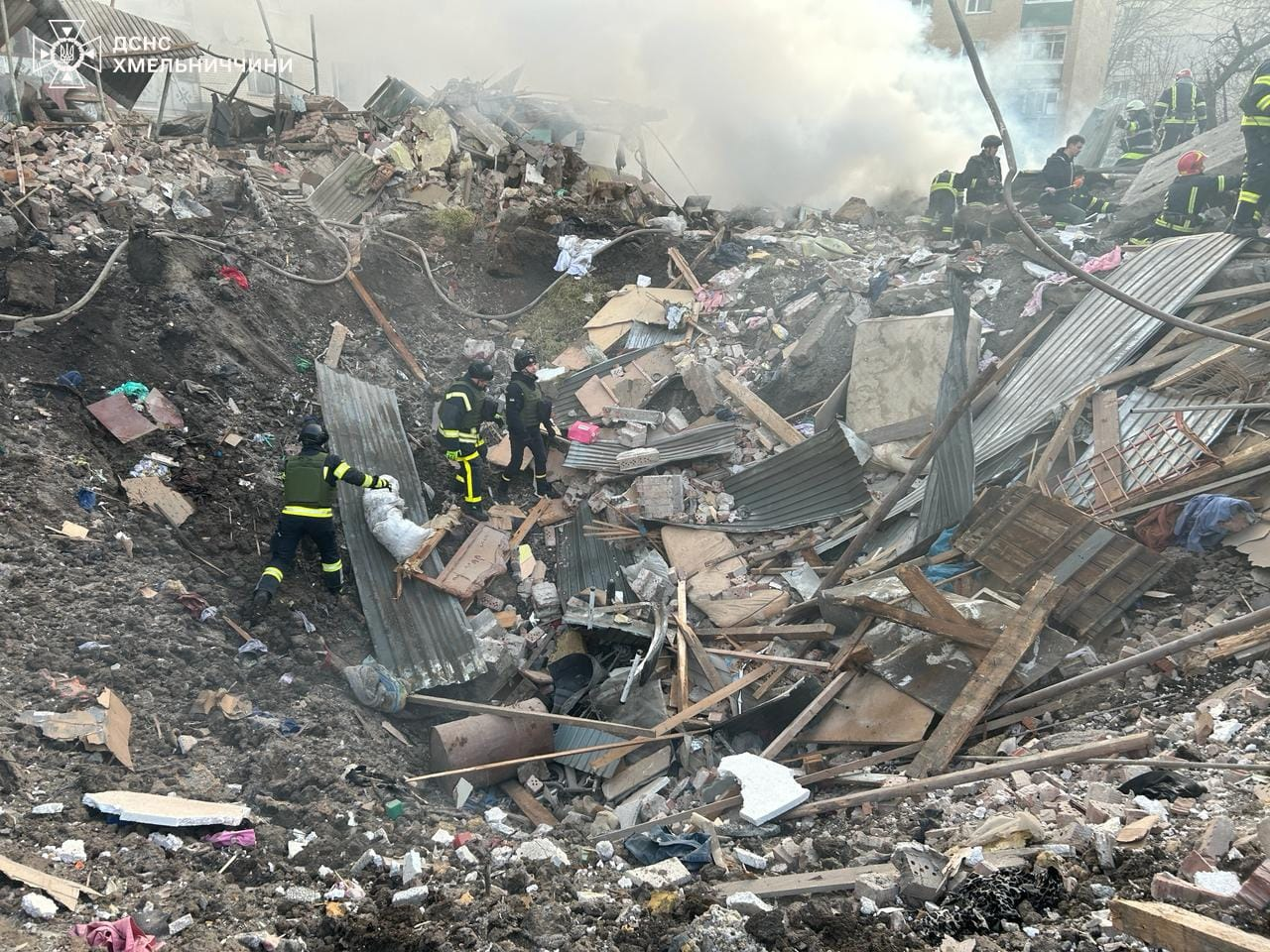
The aftermath of a Russian missile strike in Khmelnytskyi in March 2024 that killed two people.

Since the start of the Russian invasion of Ukraine, Khmelnytskyi has become a major place for internally displaced people from the front lines. The first estimates put the IDP population in the city itself at 16,000 on 13 March 2022, with the IDPs being given items by volunteers. A later estimate in June by the city council put the number of IDPs at 43,400, although this is for the whole Khmelnytskyi urban hromada. In April of 2023, a Coordination Council for IDPs was established in the city to help arrange things and employment. The following year, in April, two dormitories were opened that were reconstructed specifically for IDPs in cooperation with Nefco and could house about 200 people. There was also another project for several high-rises funded by the EU at the time, still ongoing. Along with IDPs, some universities at the front lines were also evacuated to the city, including Kherson National Technical University along with its lecturers (prior to Kherson's liberation as part of the 2022 Kherson counteroffensive). Another higher education institution that moved was the Mariupol Construction College. As with most other major cities, Khmelnytskyi has also been the target of Russian drone strikes since the start of the war. One of the first was in late March 2022, which struck an industrial facility, which was followed by another missile attack in October that damaged another facility and some apartments and temporarily cut off electricity and water. The strikes became deadlier on 31 December 2022, when missiles hit many apartments and a petrol station, injuring ten people and putting two people in critical condition. One person was killed in February of 2023 when Shahed drones hit residential housing. Two more people were killed, and eight were injured on 22 March 2024 after a massive attack across Ukraine.

== Sources ==
- Єсюнін, Сергій Миколайович (2012). Незнане Поділля. Видавництво «Бедрихів край».
- Єсюнін, Сергій Миколайович (2008). Прогулянка Проскуровом. Історичні нариси. Хмельницький обласний краєзнавчий музей.
- Мехеда, M.I. (1959). Поділля в роки громадянської війни (лютий 1918 р. — грудень 1920 р.). Вінницьке книжково-газетне видавництво.
- Тронько, П. Т. (1971). Історія міст і сіл Української РСР: Хмельницька область. Kyiv: Інститут історії Академії наук УРСР.
