= Horodok Raion =

Horodok Raion can refer to:

- Horodok Raion, Khmelnytskyi Oblast, Ukraine
- Horodok Raion, Lviv Oblast, Ukraine
- Haradok Raion, Vitebsk Oblast, Belarus
