= Rozsosha rural hromada =

Rozsosha rural hromada Розсошанська сільска громада
- Hromada
- Interactive map of Rozsosha rural hromada
- Country: Ukraine
- Oblast: Khmelnytskyi Oblast
- Raion: Khmelnytskyi Raion

Area
  - Total: 335.9 km^{2} (129.7 sq mi)

Population
  - Total: 11,420
- Website: rozsoshanska-gromada.gov.ua

Rozsosha rural hromada (Ukrainian: Розсошанська сільська громада) is one of the hromadas of Khmelnytskyi Raion in Khmelnytskyi Oblast in Ukraine. Its administrative centre is the village of Rozsosha.

== Composition ==
The hromada encompasses 26 villages:

- Andriikivtsi
- Balamutivka
- Ivanivka
- Ivankivtsi
- Karpivtsi
- Korolivka
- Kudryntsi
- Lekhnivka
- Luhove
- Luka
- Malynychi
- Monastyrok
- Mykhailivka
- Mykhalkivtsi
- Mykytyntsi
- Nyzhchi Vovkivtsi
- Perehinka
- Rozsosha (administrative centre)
- Ruzhychanka
- Ryzhulyntsi
- Shumivtsi
- Skarzhyntsi
- Slobidka
- Vydoshnia
- Vynohradivka
- Vyshchi Vovkivtsi
