= Smotrych (river) =

Smotrych Ukrainian: Смотрич
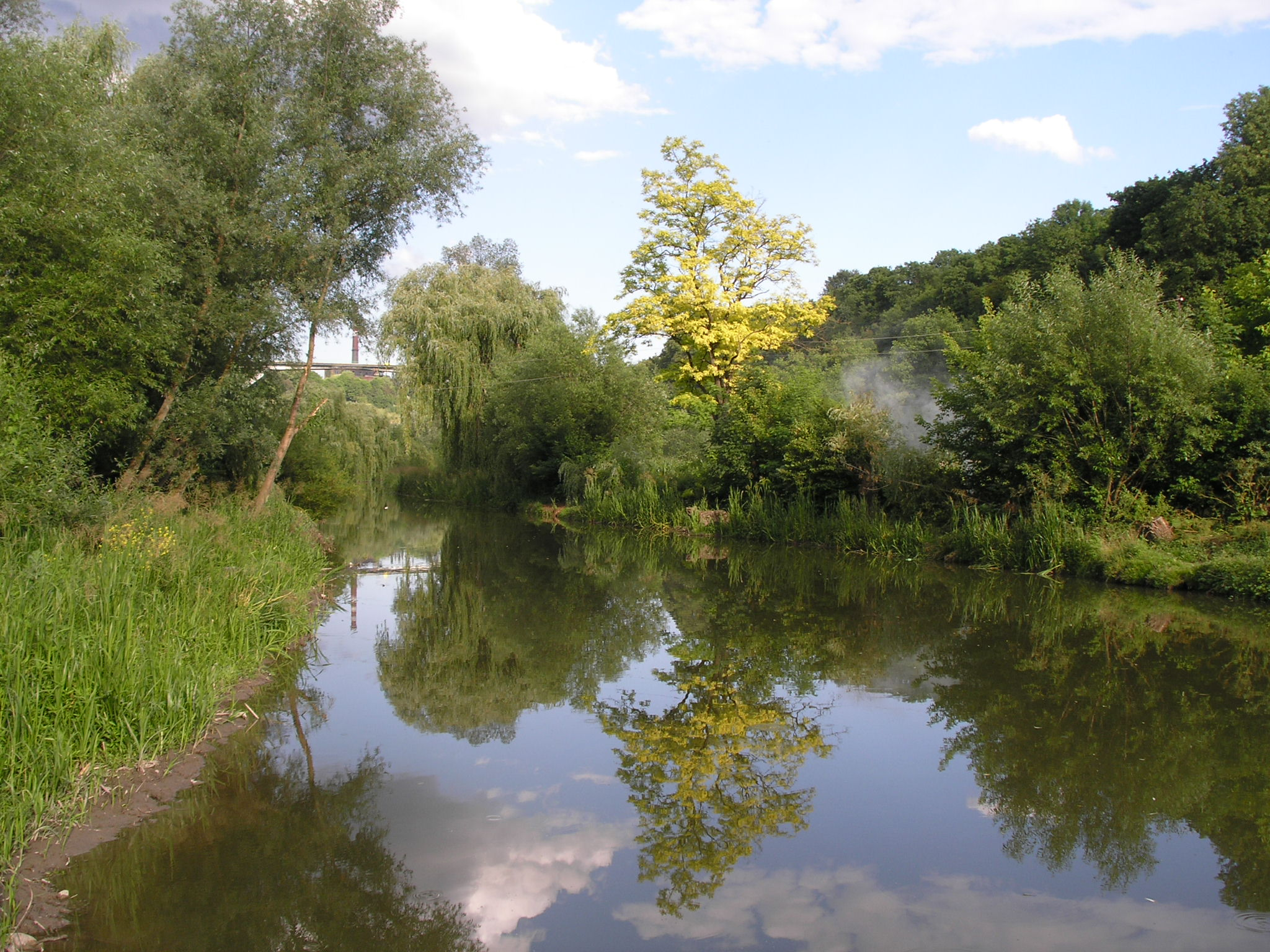
- The Smotrych River seen near the historic city of Kamianets-Podilskyi, Ukraine.

Location
- Country: Ukraine
- Oblast: Khmelnytskyi Oblast
- City: Kamianets-Podilskyi

Physical characteristics
- Source
  - location: Nemychyntsi
  - coordinates: 49°19′54″N 26°45′47″E
- Mouth
  - location: Dniester
  - coordinates: 48.5642°N 26.6378°E
- Length: 168 km (104 mi)
- Basin size: 1,800 km^{2} (690 sq mi)

Basin features
- Progression: Dniester→ Dniester Estuary→ Black Sea
- Designation

Ramsar Wetland
- Official name: Lower Smotrych River
- Designated: 29 July 2004
- Reference no.: 1401

The Smotrych (Ukrainian: Смотрич; Polish: Smotrycz) is a left tributary of the Dniester, flowing through the Podillia upland of western Ukraine. Its length is 168 km (104 mi), and its drainage basin covers 1,800 km^{2} (694 mi^{2}). The average width of the river is 10–15 meters wide, and at one point exceeds 40 m.

The river is particularly notable for its tall banks, which give it a ravinelike appearance. It is used for water supply, irrigation, and fishing. A small hydroelectric station is situated on it, as well as the city of Kamianets-Podilskyi, the urban-type settlement Smotrych and the town of Horodok (Khmelnytskyi Oblast).
