= Horodok Raion, Khmelnytskyi Oblast =

Former subdivision of Khmelnytskyi Oblast, Ukraine

Horodok Raion Городоцький район
- Raion
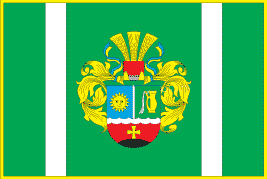
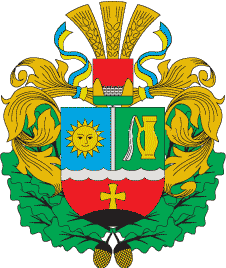
- Flag Coat of arms

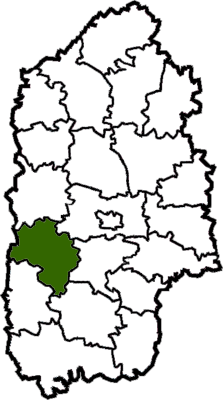
- Coordinates: 47°46′36″N 27°19′27″E
- Country: Ukraine
- Region: Khmelnytskyi Oblast
- Established: 29 April 1923
- Disestablished: 18 July 2020
- Admin. center: Horodok
- Subdivisions: List: 1 — city councils; 1 — settlement councils; 29 — rural councils; Number of localities: 1 — cities; 1 — urban-type settlements; 71 — villages; 1 — rural settlements

Government
  - Governor: Oleksandr Vorotnyi (PR)

Area
  - Total: 1,110 km^{2} (430 sq mi)

Population (2020)
  - Total: 45,429 ▼
  - Density: 40.9/km^{2} (106/sq mi)
- Time zone: UTC+02:00 (EET)
  - Summer (DST): UTC+03:00 (EEST)
- Postal index: 32000—32067
- Area code: +380 3851
- Website: http://goradm.inf.ua

Horodok Raion (Ukrainian: Городоцький район, Horodots'kyi raion) was one of the 20 administrative raions (a district) of Khmelnytskyi Oblast in western Ukraine. Its administrative center was located in the city of Horodok. Its population was 58,348 as of the 2001 Ukrainian Census. The raion was abolished on 18 July 2020 as part of the administrative reform of Ukraine, which reduced the number of raions of Khmelnytskyi Oblast to three. The area of Horodok Raion was merged into Khmelnytskyi Raion. The last estimate of the raion population was 45,429 (2020 est.)

== History ==
Horodok Raion was located in the southwestern part of the Khmelnytskyi Oblast, corresponding to the modern-day boundaries of the Podolia historical region. It was established on March 7, 1923 as part of a full-scale administrative reorganization of the Ukrainian Soviet Socialist Republic.

== Subdivisions ==
At the time of disestablishment, the raion consisted of two hromadas:

- Horodok urban hromada with the administration in Horodok;
- Sataniv settlement hromada with the administration in the urban-type settlement of Sataniv.

Horodok Raion was divided in a way that follows the general administrative scheme in Ukraine. Local government was also organized along a similar scheme nationwide. Consequently, raions were subdivided into councils, which were the prime level of administrative division in the country.

Each of the raion's urban localities administered their own councils, often containing a few other villages within its jurisdiction. However, only a handful of rural localities were organized into councils, which also might contain a few villages within its jurisdiction.

Accordingly, the Horodok Raion was divided into:

- 1 city council—made up of the city of Horodok (administrative center)
- 1 settlement council—made up of the urban-type settlement of Sataniv
- 29 village councils

Overall, the raion had a total of 74 populated localities, consisting of one city, one urban-type settlement, 71 villages, and one rural settlement.

== Places of interest ==
- Sataniv Castle
