= Khmelnytskyi Raion =

Subdivision of Khmelnytskyi Oblast, Ukraine

Khmelnytskyi Raion Хмельницький район
- Raion
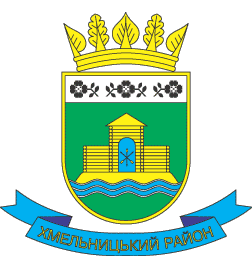
- Flag Coat of arms

- Interactive map of Khmelnytskyi Raion
- Coordinates: 49°31′06″N 26°58′27″E
- Country: Ukraine
- Oblast: Khmelnytskyi Oblast
- Established: January 4, 1965
- Admin. center: Khmelnytskyi
- Subdivisions: 27 hromadas

Government
  - Governor: Kateryna Andriychuk (PR)

Area
  - Total: 10,755 km^{2} (4,153 sq mi)

Population (2022)
  - Total: 672,305
  - Density: 62.511/km^{2} (161.90/sq mi)
- Time zone: UTC+02:00 (EET)
  - Summer (DST): UTC+03:00 (EEST)
- Postal index: 31301—31364
- Area code: +380 382
- Website: http://khmeladmin.org.ua

Khmelnytskyi Raion (Ukrainian: Хмельницький район, romanized: Khmel'nyts'kyi raion) is one of the three administrative raions (districts) of Khmelnytskyi Oblast in western Ukraine. Its administrative center is the city of Khmelnytskyi. Population: 672,305 (2022 estimate).

On 18 July 2020, as part of the administrative reform of Ukraine, the number of raions of Khmelnytskyi Oblast was reduced to three, and the area of Khmelnytskyi Raion was significantly expanded. Ten abolished raions, Derazhnia, Horodok, Krasyliv, Letychiv, Stara Syniava, Starokostiantyniv, Teofipol, Vinkivtsi, Volochysk, and Yarmolyntsi Raions, as well as the cities of Khmelnytskyi and Starokostiantyniv, which were previously incorporated as a cities of oblast significance and did not belong to the corresponding raions, were merged into Khmelnytskyi Raion. Its population was 53,686 in the 2001 Ukrainian Census. The January 2020 estimate of the raion population was 52,955 (2020 est.).

== Geography ==
Khmelnytskyi Raion is located in the central part of Khmelnytskyi Oblast, corresponding to the modern-day boundaries of the Volhynia and Podolia historical regions. One of the main rivers that runs through the raion is the Southern Bug. Geographically, formerly Khmelnytskyi Raion completely surrounded Khmelnytskyi City Municipality forming an enclave.

== Subdivisions ==
=== Current ===
After the reform in July 2020, the raion consisted of 27 hromadas:

- Antoniny settlement hromada with the administration in the rural settlement of Antoniny, transferred from Krasyliv Raion;
- Chornyi Ostriv settlement hromada with the administration in the rural settlement of Chornyi Ostriv, retained from Khmelnytskyi Raion;
- Derazhnia urban hromada with the administration in the city of Derazhnia, transferred from Derazhnia Raion;
- Horodok urban hromada with the administration in the city of Horodok, transferred from Horodok Raion;
- Hvardiiske rural hromada with the administration in the selo of Hvardiiske, retained from Khmelnytskyi Raion;
- Khmelnytskyi urban hromada with the administration in the city of Khmelnytskyi, transferred from the city of oblast significance of Khmelnytskyi;
- Krasyliv urban hromada with the administration in the city of Krasyliv, transferred from Krasyliv Raion;
- Letychiv settlement hromada with the administration in the rural settlement of Letychiv, transferred from Letychiv Raion;
- Lisovi Hrynivtsi rural hromada with the administration in the selo of Lisovi Hrynivtsi, retained from Khmelnytskyi Raion;
- Medzhybizh settlement hromada with the administration in the rural settlement of Medzhybizh, transferred from Letychiv Raion;
- Myroliubne rural hromada with the administration in the selo of Myroliubne, transferred from Starokostiantyniv Raion;
- Narkevychi settlement hromada with the administration in the rural settlement of Narkevychi, transferred from Volochysk Raion;
- Rozsosha rural hromada with the administration in the selo of Rozsosha, retained from Khmelnytskyi Raion;
- Sataniv settlement hromada with the administration in the rural settlement of Sataniv, transferred from Horodok Raion;
- Shchyborivka rural hromada with the administration in the selo of Shchyborivka, transferred from Krasyliv Raion;
- Solobkivtsi rural hromada with the administration in the selo of Solobkivtsi, transferred from Yarmolyntsi Raion;
- Stara Syniava settlement hromada with the administration in the rural settlement of Stara Syniava, transferred from Stara Syniava Raion;
- Starokostiantyniv urban hromada with the administration in the city of Starokostiantyniv, transferred from Starokostiantyniv Raion and the city of oblast significance of Starokostiantyniv;
- Staryi Ostropil rural hromada with the administration in the selo of Staryi Ostropil, transferred from Starokostiantyniv Raion;
- Teofipol settlement hromada with the administration in the rural settlement of Teofipol, transferred from Teofipol Raion;
- Viitivtsi settlement hromada with the administration in the rural settlement of Viitivtsi, transferred from Volochysk Raion;
- Vinkivtsi settlement hromada with the administration in the rural settlement of Vinkivtsi, transferred from Vinkivtsi Raion;
- Volochysk urban hromada with the administration in the city of Volochysk, transferred from Volochysk Raion;
- Vovkovyntsi settlement hromada with the administration in the rural settlement of Vovkovyntsi, transferred from Derazhnia Raion;
- Yarmolyntsi settlement hromada with the administration in the rural settlement of Yarmolyntsi, transferred from Yarmolyntsi Raion;
- Zasluchne rural hromada with the administration in the selo of Zasluchne, transferred from Krasyliv Raion;
- Zinkiv rural hromada with the administration in the selo of Zinkiv, transferred from Vinkivtsi Raion.

=== Before 2020 ===
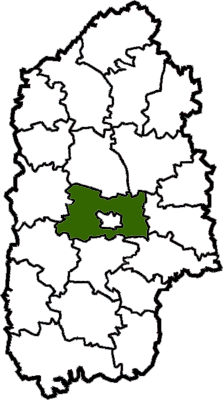
Khmelnytskyi Raion in Khmelnytskyi Oblast (1966–2020)

Khmelnytskyi Raion is divided in a way that follows the general administrative scheme in Ukraine. Local government is also organized along a similar scheme nationwide. Consequently, raions were subdivided into councils, which were the prime level of administrative division in the country.

Each of the raion's urban localities administered their own councils, often containing a few other villages within its jurisdiction. However, only a handful of rural localities were organized into councils, which also might contain a few villages within its jurisdiction.

Accordingly, Khmelnytskyi Raion was divided into:

- 1 settlement council—made up of the urban-type settlement of Chornyi Ostriv
- 38 village councils

Overall, before 2020 the raion had a total of 78 populated localities, consisting of one urban-type settlement, 76 villages, and one rural settlement.

Before the 2020 reform, the raion consisted of four hromadas:

- Chornyi Ostriv settlement hromada with the administration in Chornyi Ostriv;
- Hvardiiske rural hromada with the administration in Hvardiiske;
- Lisovi Hrynivtsi rural hromada with the administration in Lisovi Hrynivtsi;
- Rozsosha rural hromada with the administration in Rozsosha.

== History ==
Khmelnytskyi Raion was established on January 4, 1965, out of a combination of village councils from Krasyliv Raion, Letychiv Raion, Yarmolyntsi Raion, Horodok Raion, and Volochysk Raions.
