= Liudmyla Sheremet =

Ukrainian anesthesiologist and activist (1942–2014)

Hero of Ukraine Liudmyla Sheremet
- Людмила Шеремет
- Born: 21 November 1942; Makiivka, Ukrainian SSR, Soviet Union
- Died: 22 February 2014 (aged 71); Khmelnytskyi, Ukraine
- Occupations: Anestheisologist; Activist
- Years active: 1959–2009
- Awards: Hero of Ukraine

Liudmyla Oleksandrivna Sheremet (Ukrainian: Людмила Олександрівна Шеремет; 21 November 1942 – 22 February 2014) was a Ukrainian anesthesiologist and activist. She began her career as a nurse at a hospital in Makiivka and then worked as an anesthesiologist at Krasnodon District Hospital. Sheremet was employed as an anesthesiologist at Khmelnytsky City Hospital and ended her professional career working at Khmelnytsky City Perinatal Center as an obstetrician-gynecologist. She died three days after being shot in the head at a protest held at a Security Service of Ukraine building during the Revolution of Dignity in February 2014. Sheremet was posthumously conferred the title of Hero of Ukraine with the Order of Gold Star by president Petro Poroshenko in November 2014.

== Early life and career ==
On 21 November 1942, Sheremet was born in the city of Makiivka in the Donetsk Oblast which was under German occupation at the time. Her father was a power sub-station controller and her mother stayed at home to raise Sheremet and her three elder siblings. Upon the death of Sheremet's father when she was in the ninth grade, she made a decision to become a doctor. Her first attempt to enter the medical profession at the local medical institute was unsuccessful, so she worked as a nurse at a hospital in Makiivka and then as an anaesthesiologist at Krasnodon District Hospital from 1959 to 1962 after receiving her surgical degree.

She relocated to the city of Khmelnytski in 1969 and acquired employment as an anaesthesiologist at Khmelnytsky City Hospital where she remained until 1977. Sheremet left the hospital due to the poor interior working conditions and enrolled on courses in gynaecology and obstetrics. Between 1977 and 2009, she worked at Khmelnytsky City Perinatal Center as an obstetrician-gynaecologist. Sheremet partook in a protest during the Orange Revolution in Kyiv in 2004. She retired from professional work in 2009.

== Personal life ==
She was married to a former student of Kyiv Civil Engineering Institute and the couple had one child.

== Death ==
During the Revolution of Dignity on the night of 19 February 2014, Sheremet was part of a protest close to the Security Service of Ukraine building in Khmelnytski when gunfire broke out. As she attempted to gain access to the building, she was struck in the head by a bullet, causing brain tissue damage. Sheremet died in the intensive care unit of Khmelnytsky City Hospital three days later. Tributes were paid to her in the city's Independence Square in which her funeral took place, and she was buried in Sharovechka Cemetery.

== Awards ==
In November 2014, Sheremet was posthumously conferred the title of Hero of Ukraine with the Order of the Gold Star "For civic courage, patriotism, heroic defense of the constitutional principles of democracy, human rights and freedoms, selfless service to the Ukrainian people, revealed during the Revolution of Dignity" by president Petro Poroshenko. A memorial plaque of her was unveiled at her residence in Khmelenytski in February 2015. On the Day of the Heroes of the Heavenly Hundred in February 2015, she and the other Euromaidan activists were honoured by Poroshenko with the signed decree "On honoring the feat of the participants of the Revolution of Dignity and perpetuating the memory of the Heroes of the Heavenly Hundred."

She was posthumously conferred the Medal "For Sacrifice and Love for Ukraine" in June 2015 and Khmelnytski City Council awarded her posthumous honorary citizenship in one of its sessions in August 2015. A memorial sign dedicated to her was erected close to the Security Service of Ukraine building in Khmelnytski in March 2016.
