= Horodok, Khmelnytskyi Oblast =

City in Khmelnytskyi Oblast, Ukraine

Horodok Городок
- City
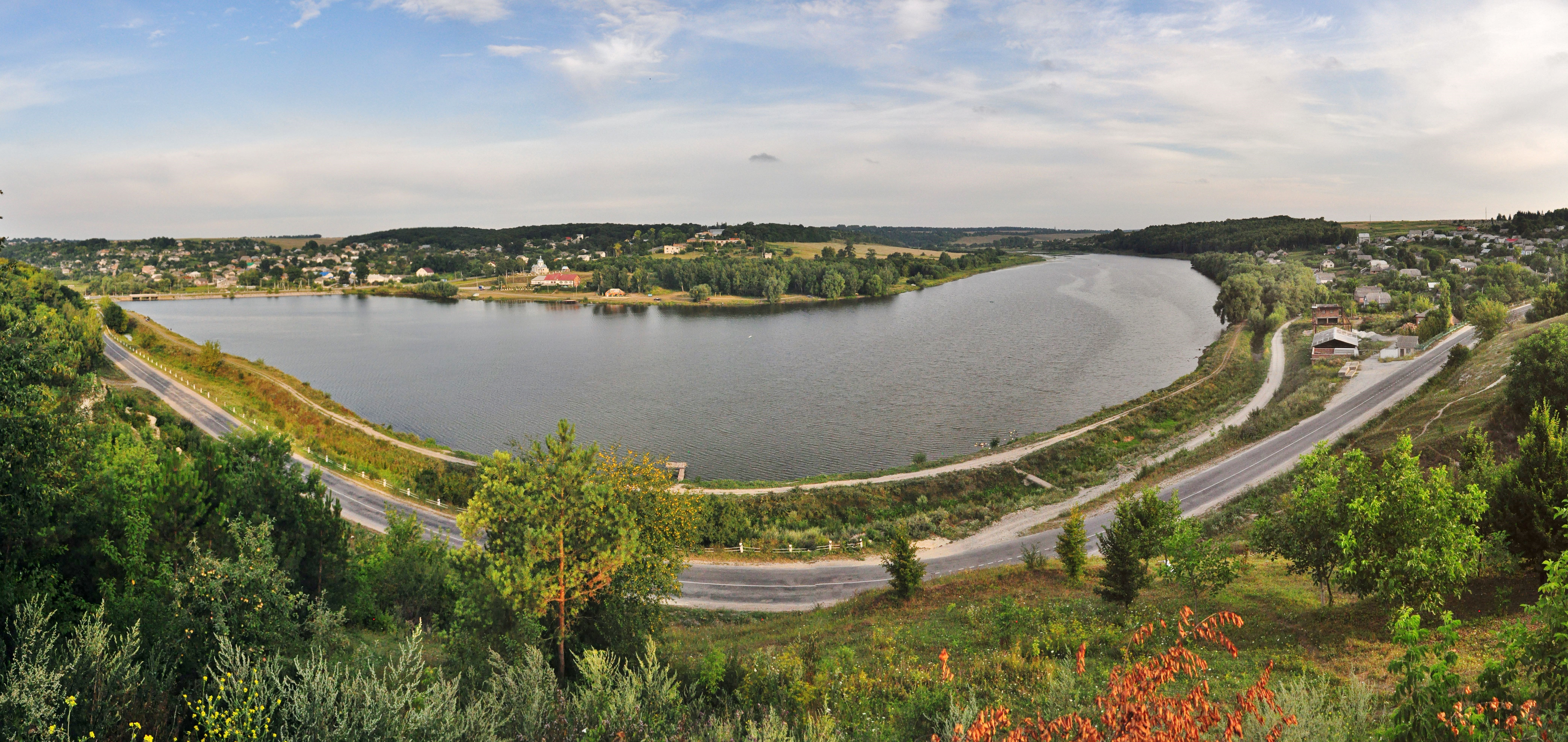
- Skyline of Horodok

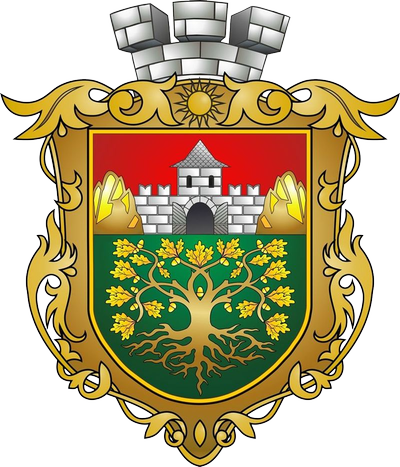
- Flag Seal

- Location within Ukraine Location within Khmelnytskyi Oblast
- Country: Ukraine
- Oblast: Khmelnytskyi Oblast
- Raion: Khmelnytskyi Raion
- Hromada: Horodok urban hromada

Population (2001)
  - Total: 17,746

Horodok (Ukrainian: Городок, IPA: [ɦoroˈdɔk], Polish: Gródek) is a city in Khmelnytskyi Raion, Khmelnytskyi Oblast (province) of Ukraine. It hosts the administration of Horodok urban hromada, one of the hromadas of Ukraine. It is located on the Smotrych river in the historical region of Podolia. Current population is 15,633 (2022 estimate).

== History ==
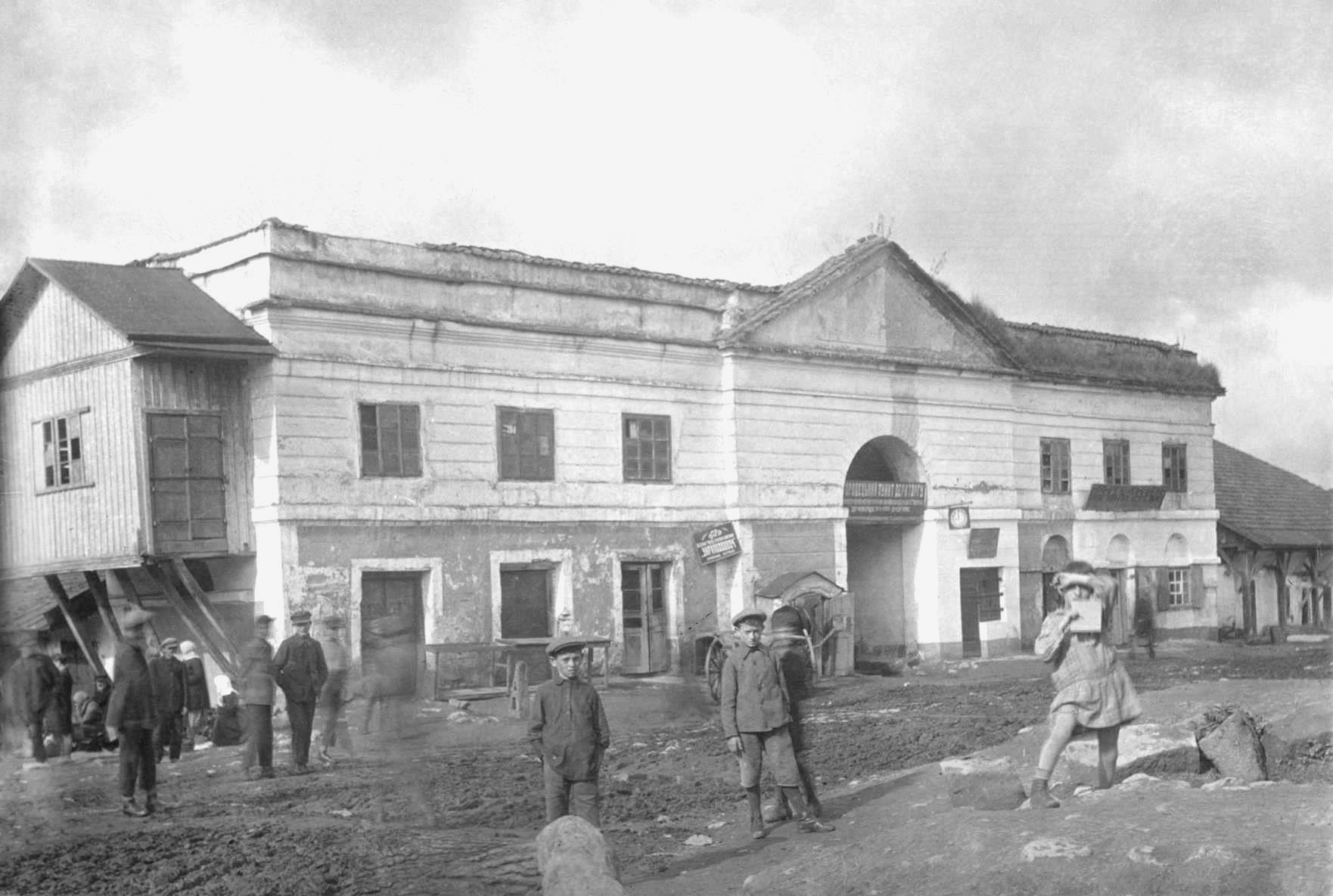
Town hall in c. 1930

Initially the town was called Nowodwór until the name Gródek first appeared in a letter of King Sigismund I the Old to owners Mikołaj Herburt and Jan Świercz. It was a private town of various nobility, including the Herburt, Świercz and Zamoyski families, administratively located in the Podolian Voivodeship in the Lesser Poland Province of the Kingdom of Poland. By the first half of the 16th century, Gródek was fortified. In order to repopulate and rebuild the town after 16th-century Tatar raids, the Zamoyski family brought Polish settlers from the Vistula and San rivers to Gródek. Podolian voivode Jan Jakub Zamoyski built a hospital and a monastery of the Sisters of Mercy in 1774. In 1778, Franciscans moved to Gródek from Kamieniec Podolski.

After the Second Partition of Poland in 1793, the town was annexed by Russia. In 1837, a sugar factory was opened. In the 1880s, the town had a population of 7,500, mostly Polish by ethnicity and Catholic by confession with a sizeable Jewish minority of 2,500. At the time, it had a sugar factory, a belt, rope and harness factory, a soap factory, and four tanneries. Six annual fairs were held. In July 1919 Horodok was the site of a battle fought between the Ukrainian People's Army and the Bolsheviks.

The headquarters of the Soviet 12th Army was based in Horodok shortly before the Soviet invasion of Poland at the start of World War II in September 1939. The 12th Army attacked towards Tarnopol, Sambor, Przemyśl and the Polish border with Romania and Hungary. During World War II, the town was occupied by Germany from July 1941 to March 1944.

The town's population was 17,746 according to the 2001 census. Until 18 July 2020, Horodok was the administrative center of Horodok Raion. The raion was abolished in July 2020 as part of the administrative reform of Ukraine, which reduced the number of raions of Khmelnytskyi Oblast to three. The area of Horodok Raion was merged into Khmelnytskyi Raion.

== Demographics ==
In 2001, Horodok had a population of 17,509, which increased to 17,746 in 2022. The overwhelming majority of the population are ethnic Ukrainians, yet the city is home to a large Polish community, which accounts for a bit less than 20% of the population. The exact ethnic composition as of the 2001 Ukrainian census was as follows:

Ethnic groups in Horodok
	percent
Ukrainians	79.31%
Poles	18.47%
Russians	1.78%
Belarusians	0.11%
others	0.33%

== Notable people ==
- Oleksandr Hereha - Ukrainian businessman
- Clara Lemlich - American union organizer, suffragist
- Jan Paul Lenga - Priest, archbishop

== Gallery ==
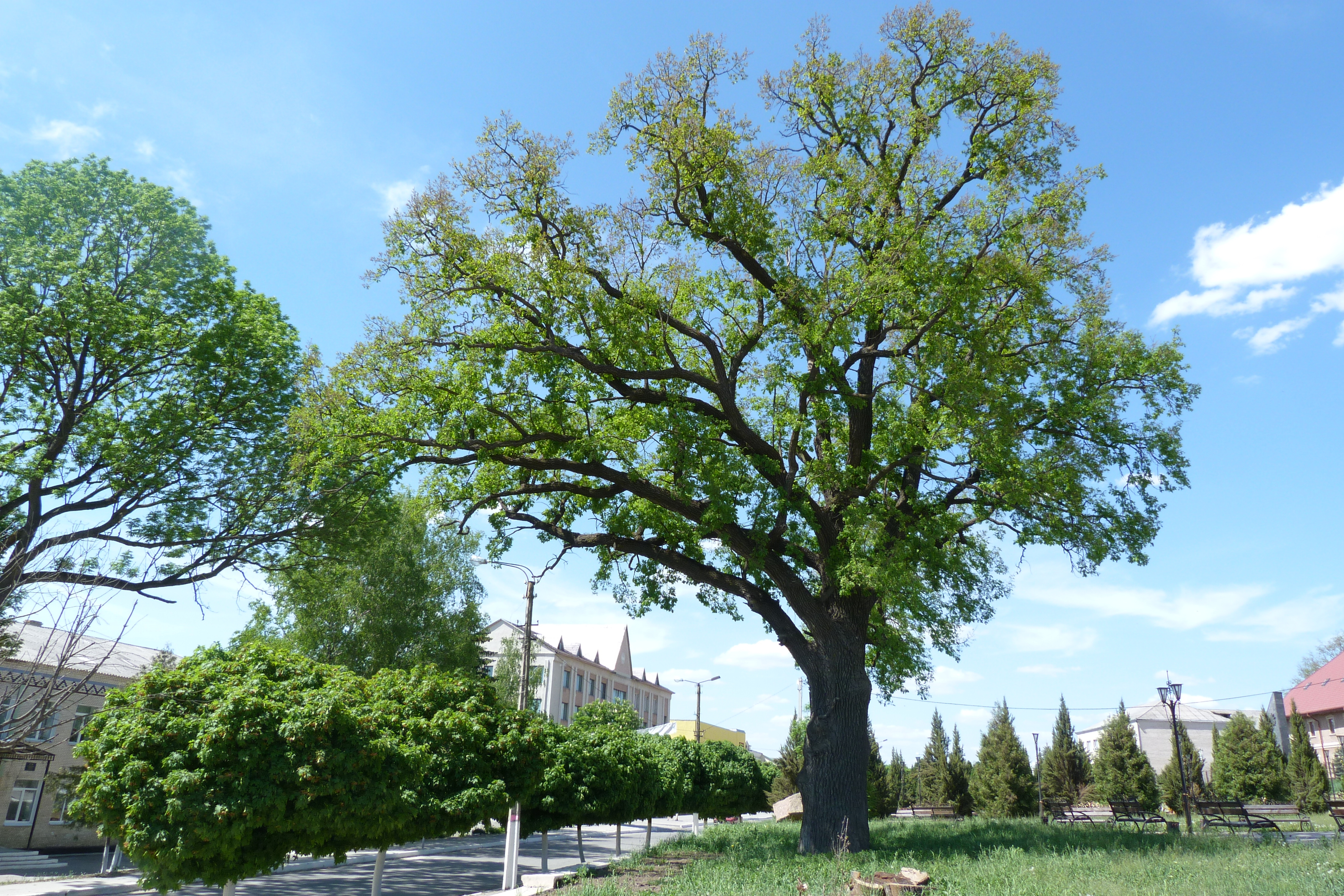
Ancient oak in downtown Horodok

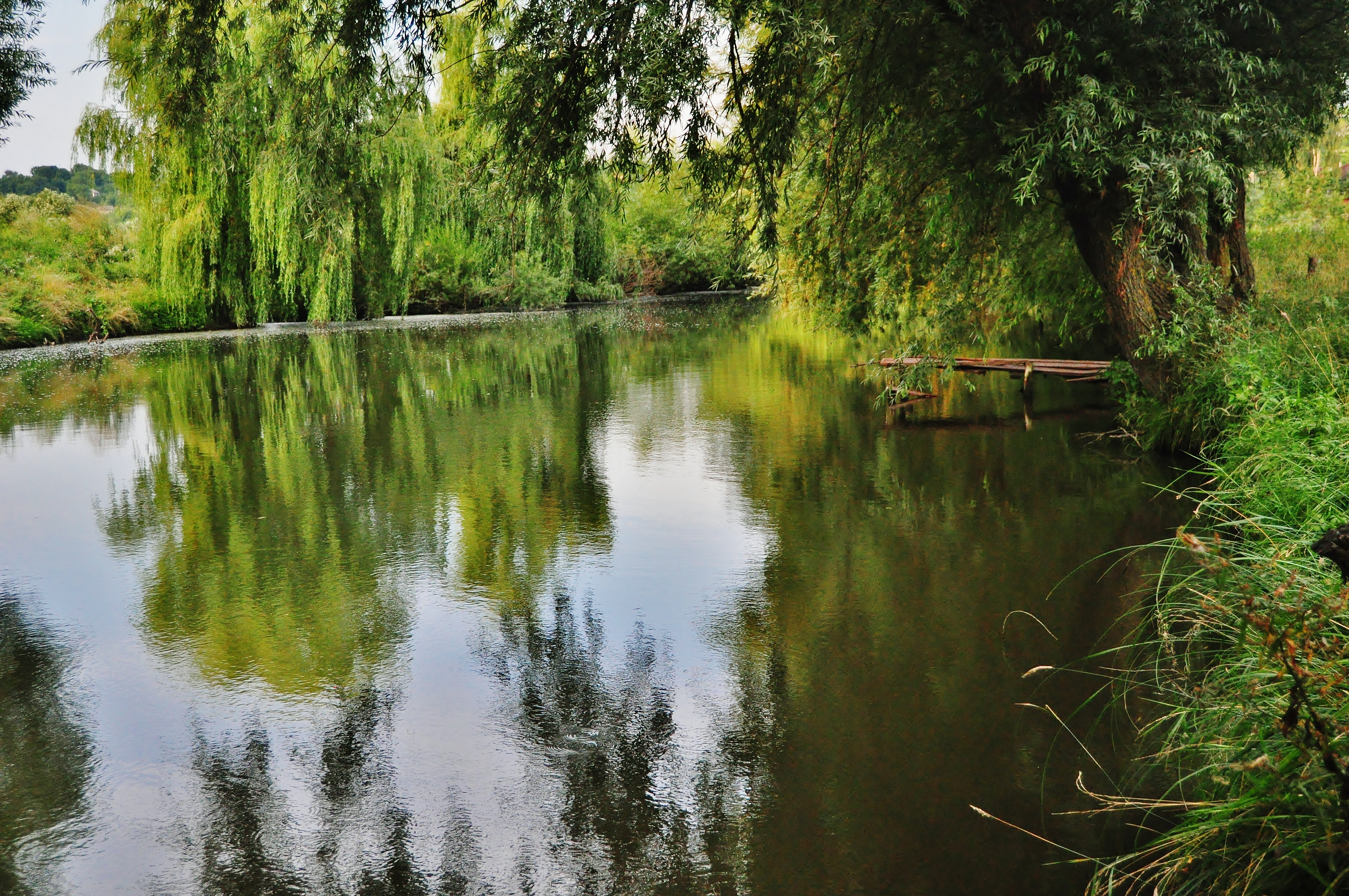
The Smotrych River in Horodok

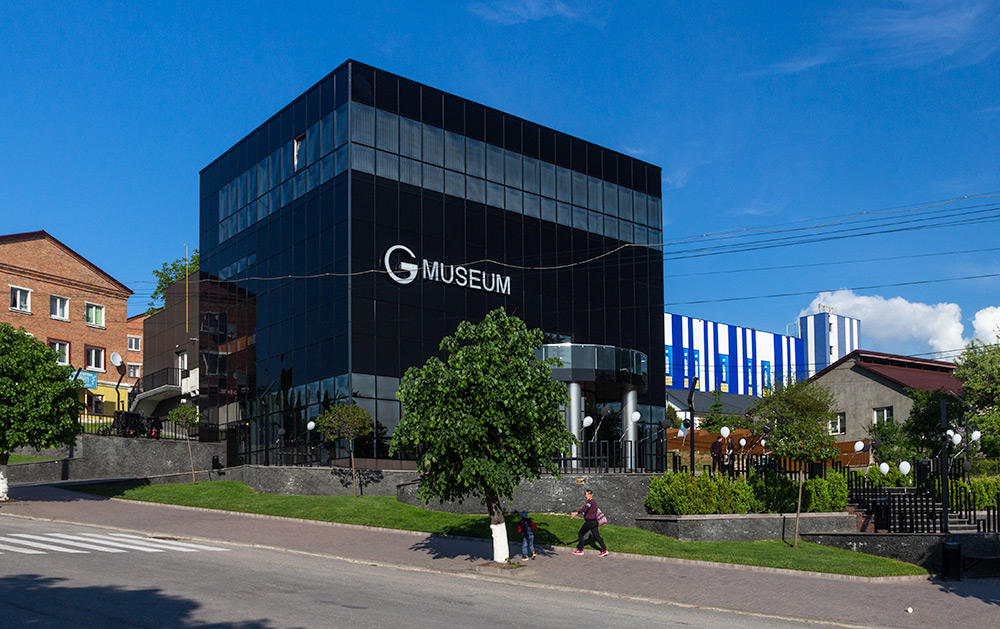
Local history museum

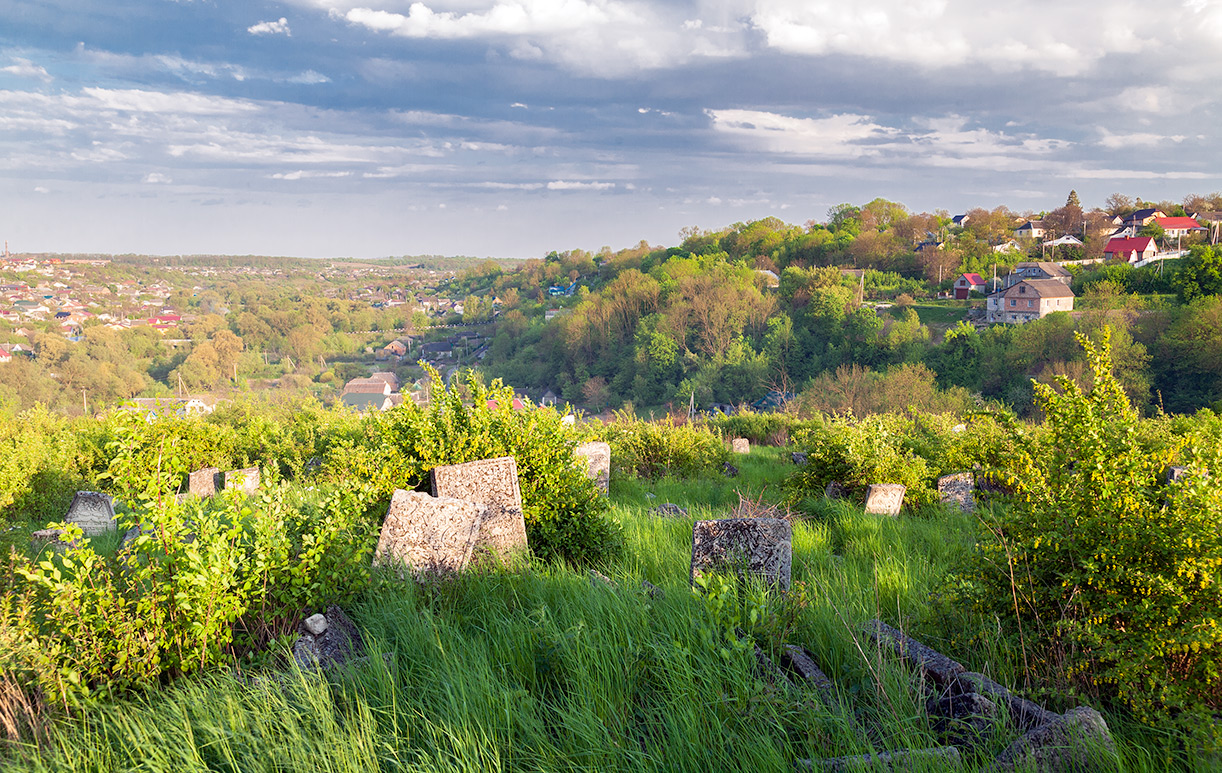
Jewish cemetery
