= Khmelnytskyi urban hromada =

Urban hromada of Khmelnytskyi Oblast, Ukraine

Khmelnytskyi urban hromada Хмельницька міська громада
- Hromada
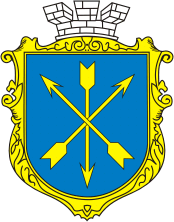
- Seal

- Location within Khmelnytskyi Oblast Location within Ukraine
- Coordinates: 49°25′0″N 27°00′0″E
- Country: Ukraine
- Oblast: Khmelnytskyi Oblast
- Raion: Khmelnytskyi Raion

Area
  - Total: 493.9 km^{2} (190.7 sq mi)

Population (2023)
  - Total: 279,663
- Website: www.khm.gov.ua

Khmelnytskyi urban hromada (Ukrainian: Хмельницька міська територіальна громада, romanized: Khmelnytska miska terytorialna hromada) is one of the hromadas of Ukraine, located in Khmelnytskyi Raion within Khmelnytskyi Oblast. Its capital is the city of Khmelnytskyi.

Khmelnytskyi urban hromada has an area of 493.9 km^{2} (190.7 mi^{2}), as well as a population of 279,663 (as of 2023).

== Composition ==
In addition to one city (Khmelnytskyi) and one settlement (Bohdanivtsi), there are 23 villages within the hromada:

- Bakhmativtsi
- Berezove
- Bohdanivtsi
- Cherepivka
- Cherepova
- Davydkivtsi
- Ivankivtsi
- Ivashkivtsi
- Klymkivtsi
- Kolyban
- Kopystyn
- Mala Kolyban
- Malashivtsi
- Masivtsi
- Matskivtsi
- Oleshyn
- Parkhomivtsi
- Pyrohivtsi
- Prybuzke
- Sharovechka
- Velyka Kalynivka
- Vodychky
- Volytsia
