= Volochysk Raion =

Former subdivision of Khmelnytskyi Oblast, Ukraine

Volochysk Raion Волочиський район
- Raion
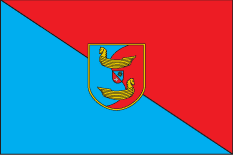
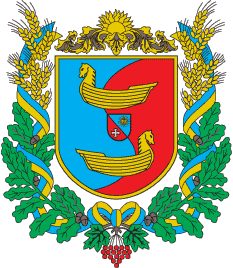
- Flag Coat of arms

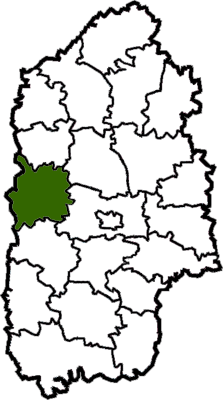
- Coordinates: 49°33′11″N 26°25′07″E
- Country: Ukraine
- Region: Khmelnytskyi Oblast
- Established: 1923
- Disestablished: 18 July 2020
- Admin. center: Volochysk
- Subdivisions: List: 1 — city councils; 2 — settlement councils; 40 — rural councils; Number of localities: 1 — cities; 2 — urban-type settlements; 85 — villages; 0 — rural settlements

Government
  - Governor: Paziuk Serhii Mykolaiovych

Area
  - Total: 1,103 km^{2} (426 sq mi)

Population (2020)
  - Total: 48,875
  - Density: 44.31/km^{2} (114.8/sq mi)
- Time zone: UTC+02:00 (EET)
  - Summer (DST): UTC+03:00 (EEST)
- Postal index: 31200-31274
- Area code: 380-3845
- Website: Volochysk District Council website

Volochysk Raion (Ukrainian: Волочиський район) was a raion (administrative district) of Khmelnytskyi Oblast. Its area was 1,103 square kilometres, and the administrative center was Volochysk. The raion was abolished on 18 July 2020 as part of the administrative reform of Ukraine, which reduced the number of raions of Khmelnytskyi Oblast to three. The area of Volochysk Raion was merged into Khmelnytskyi Raion. The last estimate of the raion population was 48,875 (2020 est.)

== Geography ==
Volochysk Raion was south of Teofipol Raion, west of Krasyliv Raion and Khmelnytskyi, north of Horodok Raion, and east of Ternopil Oblast.

The Buzhok, Grabarka, Zbruch, Sluch, Ushuka and other rivers flowed through the district. The district was the source of the Southern Bug River (near the village Kholodets). There was a rail line through the district as well as the Uzhhorod-Ternopil-Kropyvnytskyi-Donetsk E50 highway. Two gas pipelines ran through the district, Dashava-Kyiv and Kyiv-Western Ukraine.

== History ==
There were more than 70 archaeological sites in the district. The sites included Paleolithic, Mesolithic, Bronze Age, Early Iron Age, Chernyakhov culture and Kievan Rus' settlements.

From 1923 to 1932 the district was part of Proskuriv region, then from 1932 to 1937 it was part of Vinnytsia Oblast. Following that from 1937 to 1954 it was part of Kamenets Podolsk region. Since 1954 it has been part of Khmelnytskyi Oblast.

During the 1930s collectivization of farms was enforced under Soviet rule. By June 10, 1932, 83.4% of the farms in the district had been collectivized. By 1935 the process was complete and there were no longer any privately owned farms. In 1932 an agricultural college was opened which trained students in agronomy and animal husbandry. On March 1, 1930 a communist newspaper “Dawn” began publication. In 1934 a library for adults was opened and in 1937 a children's library followed.

During World War II there was a heavy loss of life and property in the district. Thousands of residents were killed or transported to Germany to labor camps. After the war the property losses were estimated at 107.8 million rubles, based on prewar values.

== Subdivisions ==
At the time of disestablishment, the raion consisted of three hromadas:

- Narkevychi settlement hromada with the administration in the urban-type settlement of Narkevychi;
- Viitivtsi settlement hromada with the administration in the urban-type settlement of Viitivtsi;
- Volochysk urban hromada with the administration in Volochysk.

The Volochysk Raion consisted of 1 city (Volochysk), 2 urban-type settlements (Viitivtsi and Narkevychi), and 85 villages. The villages of the Volochysk Raion included:

- Avratyn
- Bahlai
- Balkivtsi
- Berezin
- Bohdanivka
- Bokyyivka
- Bronivka
- Bubnivka
- Chernyava
- Chervonyy Kut
- Chervonyy Ostriv
- Chuheli
- Dzelentsi
- Dzerzhyns'ke
- Fedirky
- Gonorivka
- Harnyshivka
- Haydayky
- Hliadky
- Hrechana
- Ivanivtsi
- Ivanivka
- Kachuryntsi
- Kanivka
- Kholodets
- Klynyny
- Kopachivka Druha
- Kopachivka
- Korystova
- Kryshtopivka
- Kryvachyntsi
- Kupil
- Kurovechka
- Kurylivka
- Kuschivka
- Kushnyrivka
- Kushnyrivska Slobidka
- Levkivtsi
- Lonky
- Lozova
- Lychivka
- Manachyn
- Medvedivka
- Mochulyntsi
- Myrivka
- Myslova
- Nova Hreblya
- Novolensk
- Ozhyhivtsi
- Pahutyntsi
- Pal'chyntsi
- Pavlykivtsi
- Petrivschyna
- Petrivs'ke
- Petrivka
- Petrykivtsi
- Polana
- Popivtsi
- Porokhnia
- Postolivka
- Pysarivka
- Ratsiborivka
- Ripniv
- Ryabiyivka
- Sarniv
- Schasnivka
- Serbyn
- Serhiivka
- Shmyrky
- Sluch
- Sobolivka
- Solomna
- Tarnoruda
- Trytelnyky
- Velyki Zherebky
- Vil'shany
- Vochkivtsi
- Vydava
- Vyhoda
- Yahnivtsi
- Zavaliiky
- Zaychyky
- Zbruchivka
- Zelena
- Zhovtneve
