= Bordziłowski family =

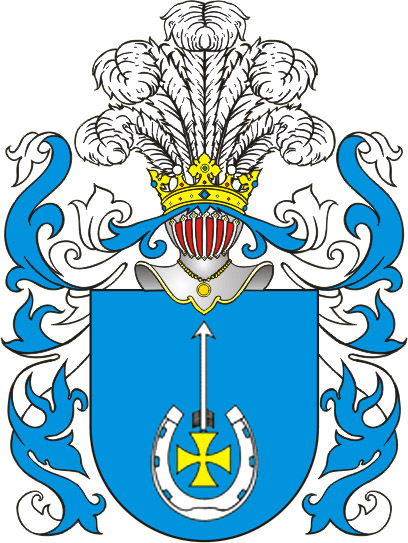
Białynia coat of arms

The House of Bordziłowski (Belarusian: Бардзілоўскі, romanized: Bardziloŭski, Lithuanian: Bardzilauskas, Russian: Бордзиловский, romanized: Bordzilovskiy), also known as Harbuz-Bordziłowski, was a noble family of the Grand Duchy of Lithuania and later the Russian Empire. The family is associated with the Białynia coat of arms.

== Origins and Etymology ==
There are several theories regarding the origins of the family name and lineage.

Linguistic studies on Belarusian anthroponymy suggest that the root of the surname, Bardzila, may be derived from the name of the 13th-century Lithuanian duke Bardys (mentioned in the Hypatian Codex as a brother of Traidenis).

According to the family's own tradition and heraldic legends, the Bordziłowski line (specifically the Harbuz branch) originated from Greater Poland (Duchy of Masovia) from a warrior named Harbuz, who is mentioned in records as early as 1332 during the reign of King Ladislaus the Short. Some sources also mention the family's establishment in Mazovia around 1480.

== History ==
Documentary evidence firmly places the family in the Mstsislaw and Vitebsk Voivodeships (specifically Krychaw starostwo) of the Grand Duchy of Lithuania by the early 16th century.

The first documented representative, Ivashka, owned a number of estates in the Krychaw starostwo based on privileges from King Sigismund I the Old (1523) and Prince Vasily Solomeretsky. Some narratives suggest he may have served in the army under Vasili III of Russia or the Polish Crown, but it is confirmed that for his military service he was granted the estate in the village of Bardzily, which became the nest of the family.

In the 17th century, the family expanded significantly, and its members held positions in the local administration and served in the military. For example, Benedykt Bordziłowski was a major in a pancerni banner under the command of the Voivode of Vilnius Michał Kazimierz Pac (1680).

The Bordziłowskis were recognized as nobility by the decree of the Minsk Noble Deputy Assembly on 6 August 1802 and were entered into the 1st part of the Noble Genealogy Book.

== Estates ==
The family's initial possessions were located in the Krychaw starostwo. The progenitor Ivashka owned the estates of Bałačynskaje, Kałyšeŭskaje (possibly the folwark Staroje Siało in the Mogilev district), Taŭpyčanskaje (probably the folwark Papoŭka), and Dalhašeŭskaje, as well as the estates of Bardzily, Makryda, and Halna Slabada. The privilege for these lands from Sigismund I is dated 9 May 1523.

In the 17th and 18th centuries, the estates were fragmented among numerous descendants. In the 19th century, family members owned or lived in estates in the Orsha Uyezd, Rechytsa Uyezd, Grodno Uyezd, Lida Uyezd, and Borisov Uyezd of the Russian Empire.

Notable Bordziłowski family members (in Polish/Lithuanian)
- Iwan Harbuz-Bordziłowski (1504-????)
  - Roman Harbuz-Bordziłowski (1534-????) - Bardily (Lithuanian: Bardzilai)
    - Mateusz Harbuz-Bordziłowski (1564-????)
      - Artemy Harbuz-Bordziłowski (1594-????)
      - Dionizjusz Harbuz-Bordziłowski
        - Kariat Harbuz-Bordziłowski (1635-????)
        - Filip Harbuz-Bordziłowski (1648-????)
          - Teodor Harbuz-Bordziłowski (1668-????)
          - Andriej Harbuz-Bordziłowski (1683-????)
            - Aleksandar Harbuz-Bordziłowski (1714-????)
            - Filip Harbuz-Bordziłowski
              - Antoni Harbuz-Bordziłowski (1741-1821)
                - Adam Harbuz-Bordziłowski (1774-????)
                - Nikolaj Harbuz-Bordziłowski
              - Jakub Harbuz-Bordziłowski (1744-????)
                - Jan Harbuz-Bordziłowski (1774-????)
                  - Grzegorz Harbuz-Bordziłowski (1804-????)
                  - Iwan Harbuz-Bordziłowski
                - Stefan Harbuz-Bordziłowski
                  - Franciszek Harbuz-Bordziłowski (1804-????)
                  - Karol Harbuz-Bordziłowski
              - Jozef Harbuz-Bordziłowski
                - Grzegorz Harbuz-Bordziłowski (1774-????)
                - Jakub Harbuz-Bordziłowski
                - Wasyl Harbuz-Bordziłowski
                  - Mikolaj Bordziłowski (1799-????) - Vilnius
                - Zachariasz Harbuz-Bordziłowski
              - Stanisław Harbuz-Bordziłowski
          - Jan Harbuz-Bordziłowski (1684-????)
          - Pawel Harbuz-Bordziłowski
            - Stefan Harbuz-Bordziłowski (1744-????)
        - Zapisz Harbuz-Bordziłowski
      - Stefan Harbuz-Bordziłowski
        - Jan Harbuz-Bordziłowski (1650-????)
          - Bogdan Harbuz-Bordziłowski (1680-1721)
            - Jan Harbuz-Bordziłowski (1710-????)
              - Dominyk Harbuz-Bordziłowski (1740-????)
                - Jerzy Harbuz-Bordziłowski (1770-????)
                  - Jozef Harbuz-Bordziłowski (1800-????)
              - Wasyl Harbuz-Bordziłowski (1756-1820)
                - Szymon Harbuz-Bordziłowski (1777-????)
                  - Jozef Harbuz-Bordziłowski (1796-????)
                - Aleksandar Harbuz-Bordziłowski
            - Michał Harbuz-Bordziłowski
            - Teodor Harbuz-Bordziłowski
          - Wasyl Harbuz-Bordziłowski
            - Mateusz Harbuz-Bordziłowski (1710-????)
            - Michał Harbuz-Bordziłowski
              - Florian Harbuz-Bordziłowski (1740-????)
              - Stanisław Harbuz-Bordziłowski
        - Jerzy Harbuz-Bordziłowski
          - Jan Harbuz-Bordziłowski (1680-????)
          - Michał Harbuz-Bordziłowski
            - Jan Harbuz-Bordziłowski (1710-????)
          - Nikołaj Harbuz-Bordziłowski
      - Tytus Harbuz-Bordziłowski
    - Kosma Harbuz-Bordziłowski
    - Teodor Harbuz-Bordziłowski

== Transliterations ==
Bardzilowski
Language	Masculine	Feminine
Polish	Bordziłowski Bardziłowski	Bordziłowska Bardziłowska
Lithuanian	Bardzilauskas, Bardziliauskas, Barzilauskas; Burdzilauskas, Budzilauskas, Burzilauskas	Bardzilauskaitė, Bardzilauskienė Bardziliauskaitė, Bardziliauskienė Barzilauskaitė, Barzilauskienė
Belarusian (Romanization)	Бардзілоўскі (Bardziloŭski, Bardzilowski)	Бардзілоўская (Bardziloŭskaja, Bardzilouskaya, Bardzilouskaia, Bardzilowskaja, Bardzilowskaya, Bardzilowskaia)
German	Bardilowski	Bardilowska
Latvian	Bordzilovskis	Bordzilovska
Russian (Romanization)	Бордзиловский (Bordzilovskiy, Bordzilovskii, Bordzilovskij, Bordzilovsky, Bordzilovski)	Бордзиловская (Bordzilovskaya, Bordzilovskaia, Bordzilovskaja)
Ukrainian (Romanization)	Бордзіловський (Bordzilovskyi, Bordzilovskyy, Bordzilovskyj, Bordzilovsky)	Бордзіловська (Bordzilovska)

== Bibliography ==
- Залівака, А. (2007). Бардзілоўскія, Гарбуз-Бардзілоўскія гербу «Бялыня» [Bordziłowskis, Harbuz-Bordziłowskis of the "Białynia" coat of arms]. In Рыбчонак, С.; et al. (eds.). Гербоўнік беларускай шляхты. Т. 2. Б [Armorial of Belarusian Nobility. Vol. 2. B] (in Belarusian). Мінск: НАРБ. pp. 146–149. ISBN 978-985-6372-52-3.
