= Kholodets =

Rural locality in Khmelnytskyi Oblast, Ukraine

Kholodets Холодець
- Village
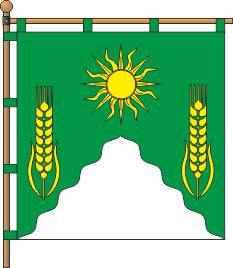
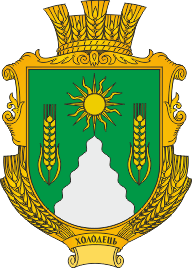
- Flag Seal

- Location within Khmelnytskyi Oblast Location within Ukraine
- Coordinates: 49°37′00″N 26°28′00″E
- Country: Ukraine
- Oblast: Khmelnytskyi Oblast
- Raion: Khmelnytskyi Raion
- Hromada: Volochysk urban hromada

Kholodets (Ukrainian: Холодець; Polish: Chołodec, Chołodziec, Hołodki) is a small village in the historical Volhynia region, and located 2–3 km from the village of Kupel, in Khmelnytskyi Raion in Khmelnytskyi Oblast of Ukraine. It belongs to Volochysk urban hromada, one of the hromadas of Ukraine. The Chołodecki surname is derived from this village.

Until 18 July 2020, Kholodets belonged to Volochysk Raion. The raion was abolished in July 2020 as part of the administrative reform of Ukraine, which reduced the number of raions of Khmelnytskyi Oblast to three. The area of Volochysk Raion was merged into Khmelnytskyi Raion.
