= Celestyn Chołodecki =

- Coat of arms: Białynia
- Born: April 11, 1816; Bednarów, Poland (currently in Ukraine)
- Died: 1867; Stryj, Poland (currently in Ukraine)
- Family: Chołodecki
- Consort: Emilia Rechronow
- Issue: Józef Białynia Chołodecki; Stanisław Karol Chołodecki
- Father: Kajetan Dominik Chołodecki
- Mother: Tekla Mitraszewska

Celestyn Chołodecki (1816–1867) was a member from the szlachta (noble) family of Chołodecki. Like his son to follow, Józef Białynia Chołodecki, Celestyn Chołodecki was a writer and frequent contributor to leaflets calling for Poland's independence from Russia. He was the brother of Tomasz Chołodecki, who was widely known in the area of Galicia as an activist and rebel.
