= Chołodecki =

Polish family name

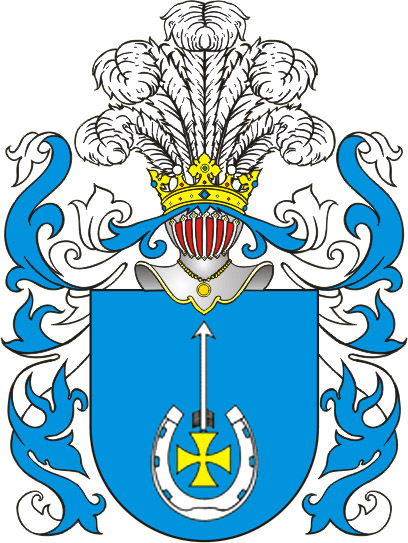
The Chołodecki szlachta from Volhynia and Galicia use the Białynia coat of arms

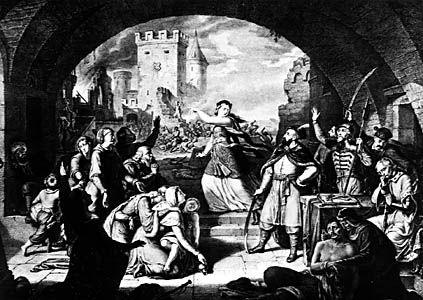
Defense of Trembowla painted by Aleksander Lesser in 1864

Chołodecki (variously spelled as Cholodecki, Hołodecki, Holodecki) is the Polish surname of one of the noble (szlachta) families. It is derived from the village of Chołodec located in Wołyń, currently located in Ukraine.

According to historian Józef Białynia Chołodecki, an unknown member of the Białynia clan was given the rights to develop the land in and around Chołodec, and that individual took the last name of Chołodecki.

The Chołodecki surname first appears in the 17th century in Poland. A Chołodecki is listed in the registers during the election of King Michał Korybut Wiśniowiecki in 1669. In the late 17th century Kazimierz Amor Chołodecki becomes a man of some stature in Włodzimierz Wołyński, living on the estate of Piatydnia.

The family was confirmed as Szlachta in 1783 and 1825 by the Austrian authorities in Galicia. In Wołyń, nobility under the stricter Russian rules was confirmed in 1811 and 1827.

== Patriotic traditions ==
The Białynia clan, to which the Chołodecki family belongs, was granted its coat of arms for bravery in battle under King Łokietek. The Chołodeckis continued their clan's tradition. In 1675, Chołodeckis took part in the famous Defense of Trembowla under Jan Samuel Chrzanowski. In that battle, a small group of soldiers managed to defend the town against a Turkish army. The family had significant members involved in the November Uprising (Tomasz Chołodecki, Ferdinand Chołodecki, Celestyn Chołodecki) of 1830. Chołodeckis played a significant role in the planning and execution of the failed Kraków Uprising of 1846. Tomasz Chołodecki was initially sentenced to death for his part, but the sentence was later reduced. Chołodeckis also took part in the battles of the January Uprising of 1863 (Tomasz Chołodecki, Ferdinand Chołodecki, Celestyn Chołodecki, Józef Białynia Chołodecki).

Due to the families' continued involvement in major upheavals in Poland's fight for independence during the 19th century, the family living in Wołyń had all of its land and belongings confiscated. The major confiscations occurred after the Kraków Uprising and the January Uprising. Some members, such as Aleksander Chołodecki, fleeing to France. The small but more prominent section of the family located in Galicia was left with mostly leasehold estates.

Chołodecki involvement in the fight for Poland's independence also extended into World War I, the Polish-Ukrainian War (Józef Białynia Chołodecki), and World War II. Witold Chołodecki, for example, was murdered by Soviet forces in Charków in 1940. During the Massacres of Poles in Volhynia in 1943 Antoni and Wiktoria Cholodecki were murdered by UPA forces, while the largest segment managed to flee west and eventually settled around the city of Wrocław. A smaller group of Chołodeckis from Huta Stara took part in the defense of the town. Huta Stara, while consisting of around 100 homes, became a regional sanctuary for 10,000 Poles who flocked to the town seeking shelter and safety from UPA attacks. A decisive battle waged on October 16, 1943, defeated the UPA and allowed the family to stay in the town until the summer of 1945, when they were forcibly repatriated to areas around Kołobrzeg. The remaining family located in Lwów settled in Poznań. Chołodeckis also fought for an end to communism in Poland. Jarosław Chołodecki was the vice-chair for the Regional Board in "Solidarność" when it was formed in 1980, and he spent over a year in jail when Poland instituted martial law in 1981.

== Estates ==
Members of the Chołodecki family owned small tracts of land and villages in Wołyń and Galicia in the 17th, 18th and 19th centuries. The most significant holdings were around Żytomierz, Włodzimierz Wołyński and Łuck, namely the villages of Obłapy, Kudynowce, Ceców, Lachowa, and Nikonówka. The family also had leaseholds in Galicia, namely Bednarów and Piatydnia. The family also had close relationships with the Potockis for hundreds of years, administering some of the vast estates of the family, including holdings in Lwów and the Brzoza Stadnicka estate into the 20th century, while a Mikołaj Chołodecki was listed as a reiter for the Potocki's as early as 1703.

== Coat of arms ==
The Białynia coat of arms is used by the Chołodeckis from Wołyń and Galicia.

== Notable members ==
Some of the notable members of Chołodecki family include:

- Tomasz Chołodecki
- Celestyn Chołodecki
- Józef Białynia Chołodecki
- Antoni Inocent Chołodecki
- Jadwiga Chołodecka
- Aleksander Chołodecki
- Jarosław Chołodecki
- Olgierd Chołodecki

== See also ==
- List of szlachta
- Noble's Democracy

== Other reading ==
- Polski slownik biograficzny (Polish Biographical Dictionary), Kraków, 2000
- Calendar of events of MSZZ Solidarity in Opole Note: Dead link (404) as of 12 Jan 2009
- Article about Jarosław Chołodecki's time in Solidarity and prison. Gazeta Wyborcza, June 2, 2005.
- Article about Jarosław Chołodecki's breakout from Uherce prison. Gazeta Wyborcza, December 24, 2008.
- Boniecki, Adam. Herbarz Polski (Polish Heraldry), Warsaw, 1899-1913
- Chołodecki, Białynia Józef. Białynia-Chołodeccy : uczestnicy spisków, więźniowie stanu (History of the Cholodecki family of the Bialynia Clan). 1911
- Wiadomość historyczna o staroźytnym obrazie Boga-rodzicy Maryi na Jasnej Gorze przy Częstochowie przez Władyslawa ksia̧zęcia Opolskiego w roku 1383 złozonym.
  (Historical information about the ancient painting of Gods birth giver Mary at Jasna Gora) 1856
- Żychliński, Tadeusz. Złota Księga Szlachty Polskiej (Golden Tome of Polish Szlachta) Vol. 23, pp. 13–19.
- State Archive of Zhytomyr Oblast (Derzhavnyi arkhiv Zhytomyrskoi oblasti) Fond 146, Title 1, Case Nr 457, Folders: 253, 253, 252, 254, 254, 255, 295, 296, 297, 298.
- Poczet szlachty galicyjskiéj i bukowińskiéj (List of Szlachta from Galicia and Bukowina) pg 37.
- Wśród róż i głogów: wspomnienia z życia Jadwigi z Białynia-Chołodeckich Sewerynowej Kaczkowskiej (1879–1918) (Amongst roses and hawthorns: remembrances from the life of Jadwiga from the Białynia-Chołodecki's Sewerynow (1879–1918) Maria Mazurkówna, 1918.
- Studia i materiały z dziejów nauki polskiej (Study and materials from the history of Polish science) Polska Akademia Nauk Komitet Historii Nauki, Polska Akademia Nauk Zakład Historii Nauki i Techniki, Published by Państwowe Wydawn. Naukowe, 1958
- Genocide and Rescue in Wołyń, Tadeusz Piotrowski 2000
