= Bodnariv =

Bodnariv Боднарів Bednarów
- village
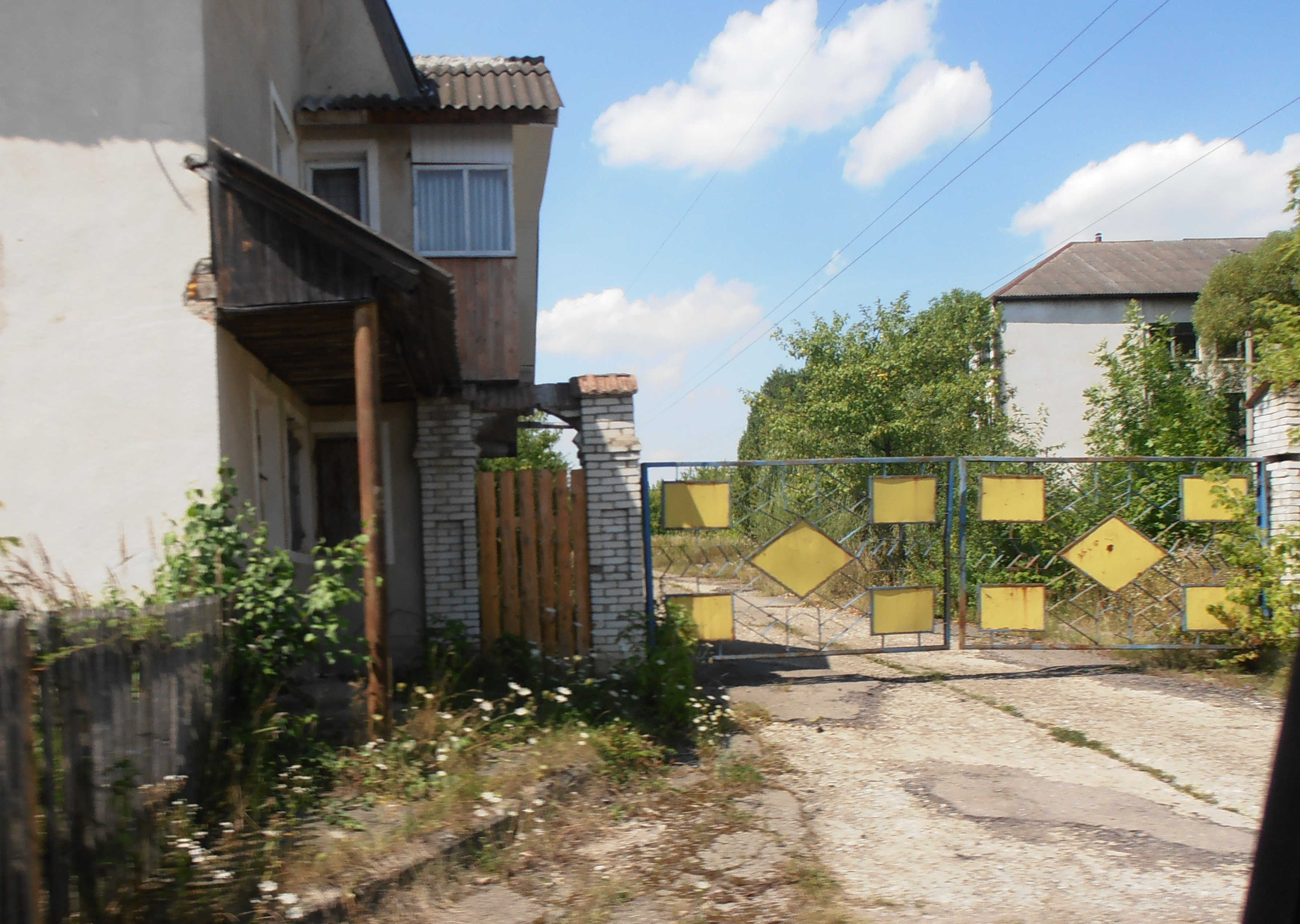
- Interactive map of Bodnariv
- Coordinates: 49°01′47″N 24°32′15″E
- Country: Ukraine
- Oblast: Ivano-Frankivsk Oblast
- Raion: Kalush

Bodnariv (Ukrainian: Боднарів, Polish: Bednarów) is a village in Kalush Raion, Ivano-Frankivsk Oblast, Ukraine.

== History ==
Bednarów was part of Austrian Galicia and had a Greek Catholic church in 1900. It was attacked by the Ukrainian Insurgent Army in 1944 during the Massacres of Poles in Volhynia and Eastern Galicia. 250 people were killed in the massacre. The town's parish church was also burned down. Only 14 survived.

There is a monument in the town to Nazi collaborator Oleksandr Lutskyi, who was born in the village.

== Notable residents ==
- Celestyn Chołodecki
- Tomasz Chołodecki
