= Józef Białynia Chołodecki =

Polish historian

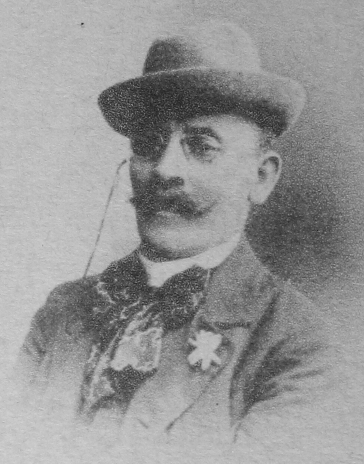
- Coat of arms: Białynia
- Full name: Józef Dominik Bartłomiej Chołodecki
- Born: 15 August 1852; Stawki, Galicia, Austria-Hungary
- Died: 30 January 1934 (aged 81); Lwów, Galicia
- Noble family: Chołodecki
- Spouses: Maryanna Bronislawa Kraussowna; Bronisława Maria Helena Karwowska
- Issue: Witold, Zdzisław, Jadwiga
- Father: Celestyn Chołodecki
- Mother: Emilia Rechronow

Józef Dominik "Kresowiec" Bartłomiej Chołodecki (15 August 1852 – 30 January 1934) was a Polish historian.

== Biography ==
Chołodecki was born in 1852 in Stawki in the Galician region of the then Austro-Hungarian empire, close to the present day city of L'viv in Ukraine. His adopted middle name of Bialynia refers to the clan and Coat of Arms of his family. Chołodecki was the son of Celestyn, a writer and a nadleśniczy of the forestry department in Galicia, and Emilia from the house of Setti da Forli. His academic studies began at home, and continued at primary school in Stryj located in present-day Ukraine. He attended high school in Lwów, and took his maturity exam on 10 October 1870. That same year he enrolled at the University of Lwów to study law, graduating in 1874.

He had to work even while attending high school due to his father's death. In 1873, a year prior to finishing his law degree, Józef applied to the Directors of the Lwów postal service. He received a position with the postal service in Czerlany, later in Niżniów, Stanisławów, and finally in Lwów. In 1880 he became the regional director of the commissars postal service in Czerniowce, he quickly rose up the ranks of the postal service until he became the director of the account departments of the Lwów postal service. He retired while at this position on his own request in 1909.

== Patriotic traditions ==
Chołodecki left his home with a strong patriotic tradition. His father, who took part in two uprisings and was jailed as a political dissident as a result, as well as other close family like Tomasz Chołodecki, a veteran of the November Uprising, had a strong influence on his upbringing. At the age of 12, he took part in the January Uprising of 1863 as courier in the territories surrounding Lwów. In 1867 while still in high school he was part of an underground student organization which was later dissolved by the Austrian authorities. While a student at the University of Lwów, Chołodecki was the most active member of the highly regarded Academic Reading room (Czytelnia Akademicka), he took an active part in an assortment of Polish organizations throughout the region. In Czerniowce he became a contributor to Gazeta Polska, a newspaper run by Klemens Kościesz Kołakowski. He became a member of the board of Czytelnia Polska, founded a library and wrote a history of the Czytelnia in 1885.

In his first literary endeavors, books and pamphlets printed from the presses of Gazeta Polska, Chołodecki wrote under the pseudonym of Walenty Ćwik, this included his historical book about Bukowina in 1884, an examination of the history of the Polish Navy and Polish artillery in 1885, and a biography of Henryk Schmitt in 1888. He used an assumed name fearing repression by the Austrian authorities. Finally he presented his literary ambitions to the minister of trade, and due to his influence through his position at the postal service in Lwów, he was granted the right to publish books under his name.

== Life in Lwów ==
After moving to Lwów, Chołodecki joined numerous organizations, becoming the president of the Postal Club, and he was able to create many other organizations that were able to grow through his support. He was verbally attacked by the president of the Lwów postal service, a man surnamed Seferowicz, in 1906 for his vigorous activity in these organizations, which the President claimed discredited him as a director at the Lwów postal service.

Chołodecki vehemently denied the charge and accused Seferowicz of a personal attack. Chołodecki was also part of many of intellectual circles and organizations, including the Organization for Polish Education, the Heraldic Organization, Organization of Studies in Przemyśl, and the Organization of Lwów Historians (Tow. Miłośników przeszłości Lwowa), which printed many of his most famous and renowned works. Between 1902 and 1908 Chołodecki was a radny for the city of Lwów. During World War I Chołodecki was jailed by the Tsarist authorities in Kiev, and he took part in the defense of Lwów during the Polish-Ukrainian War.

== Life as a writer ==
As a writer, many of Chołodecki's works dealt with the Polish November Uprising of 1830 and January Uprising of 1863. He also wrote the biographies of many prominent individuals in Poland's fight for independence. Chołodecki was a chronicler of the family history and genealogy of the Chołodecki family. He was awarded the order Polonia Restituta. He died in Lwów on 30 January 1934, aged 81.

== Publications ==
Some of his many historical works include:

- Adolf Leopold Mussil de Mussilau: szkic biograficzny (Biographical Sketch). 1915
- Aleksander Morgenbesser: życiorys na podstawie zapisków akt. (Biography) 1893
- Alfred Brzeziński: przyczynek do dziejów obrony Zamościa. 1910
- Banialuki Rolińskiego w świetle aktów procesu karnego przeci. 1908
- Białynia-Chołodeccy: uczestnicy spisków, więźniowie stanu (History of the Cholodecki family of the Bialynia Clan). 1911
- Cmentarz stryjski we Lwowie (Stryjski Cemetery in Lwow). 1913
- Czwarty pamiętnik zjazdów koleżeńskich byłych uczniów Gimnaz zest. 1910
- Dąb-Dąbczańscy i Jan Żalplachta-Zapałowicz: przyczynek do d. 1913
- Do dziejów drobnej szlachty Podola. 1911
- Do dziejów poczty w Polsce (History of Polish mail). 1899
- Eugeniusz Albert Ulatowski, więzień stanu i męczennik w swie. 1918
- Henryk Schmitt: życiorys spisany na podstawie dokumentów. (Biography)
- Jenerał Kołyszko i tegoż podkomendni na terytoryum Galicyi. 1912
- Kamilla Poh.: szkic biograficzny (Biography). 1896
- Ksiądz Jan Diugiewicz i tegoż męczennika śmierć w związku. 1930
- Księga pamiątkowa opracowana staraniem Komitetu Obywatelskie. 1904
- Księga pamiątkowa półwiekowego jubileuszu Gimnazyum im. Fran zestawił. 1909
- Kult pamięci Adama Mickiewicza w Karolowych Warach. 1894
- Lwów w listopadzie roku 1918 (Lwow in 1918). 1919
- Józef Białynia Chołodecki. (Autobiography) 1905
- Półwiekowa przeszłość Stowarzyszenia Katolickiej Młodzieży R oprac. 1906
- Przyczynek do dziejów wyprawy na Narajów r. 1846: 1910
- Rewizya w Kudryńcach w r. 1834 w świetle aktów procesu karne. 1910
- Sprawa cucyłowska r. 1848: (wspomnienie w sześćdziesiątą ro 1908
- Teatr Ludowy we Lwowie Bela Rębowicz [pseud.] 1902
- W dziesiątą rocznicę bitwy pod Zadworzem, Horpinem i Firlej. 1930
- W okowach do ślubu: wspomnienie z czasów procesu karnego. 1911
- Wojenny posiew anioła śmierci i kult pamięci poległych. 1926
- Wspomnienia z lat niedoli i niewoli: 1914–1918. 1919
- Z minionej doby: kilka wspomnień na tle zapisków prywatnych (naszkicował). 1903
- Zborów, pole chwały czesko-słowackiego oręża. 1924
- Zwierzęta przedpotopowe i inne jakie wyniszczył lekkomyślnie. 1924

== Quotes ==
"Revere the memory of your forebears, revere your forefathers graves: With their acts and service, sustain your spirit, sustain your strength..."
Polish: "Czcij przodków twych pamięć, czcij ojców mogiły: W ich dziełach, zasługach krzep ducha, krzep siły..."

== Sources ==
- Karol Lewicki, Biographical article, 1936 from Polski Słownik biograficzny (Polish Biographical Dictionary), Kraków, 2000
- A. Czołowski, Miesięcznik Heraldyczny 1935
