= William Chomsky =

American Hebrew scholar (1896–1977)

- Born: Ze'ev Chomsky; January 15, 1896; Kupil, Volhynian Governorate, Russian Empire
- Died: July 19, 1977 (aged 81); Philadelphia, Pennsylvania, U.S.
- Spouses: Elsie Simonofsky (m. 1927; died 1972); Ruth Schendel (m. 1973)
- Children: 2, including Noam
- Relatives: Aviva Chomsky (granddaughter)

Academic background
- Education: Johns Hopkins University

Academic work
- Discipline: Hebraic studies
- Institutions: Gratz College (1924–1969); Dropsie College (1955–1977)
- Notable works: Hebrew: The Eternal Language (1957)

William Chomsky (born Ze'ev Chomsky; (Note: Russian: Зеев Хомский, IPA: [ˈzʲejɪf ˈxomskʲɪj]; Ukrainian: Зєєв Хомський, IPA: [ˈzʲɛjeu̯ ˈxɔmsʲkɪj]; Hebrew: זאב חומסקי.) January 15, 1896 – July 19, 1977) was an American scholar of the Hebrew language.

Born in Kupil, in the former Russian Empire, Chomsky settled in the United States in 1913. From 1924 until 1969, he was a member of the faculty at the Jewish teacher-training institution Gratz College, becoming faculty president in 1932. In 1955, he also began teaching courses at Dropsie College, with which he was affiliated until 1977. He was the father of Noam Chomsky.

== Early life and education ==
Chomsky was born in 1896 in Kupil in the Volhynian Governorate of the Russian Empire (present-day Ukraine), the son of Meyer and Esther "Essie" Korman Chomsky. His first name was Ze'ev (meaning "wolf") and he was known by the diminutive "Velvel", the Yiddish diminutive name for Wolf. The English name "William" was chosen because of the same first initial as per Jewish custom.

His father immigrated to the United States in 1908 and worked as a presser in a clothing shop in Baltimore, and the rest of the family arrived five years later. In July 1912, at age 16, William arrived in Baltimore with his mother, Essie, and sisters Fannie (Feige) and Gertrude (Gittle). His mother died in 1919. He worked in sweatshops in Baltimore before gaining employment teaching at the city's Hebrew elementary schools, using his income to fund his studies at Johns Hopkins University. After moving to Philadelphia, Chomsky became the superintendent (principal) of the Mikveh Israel religious school from 1923.

== At Gratz and Dropsie colleges ==
From 1924, Chomsky taught at Gratz College, the oldest teacher-training college in the United States. He became the faculty president of Gratz in 1932. He became faculty chairman in 1949, retiring from this position in 1969. He was also a professor of Hebrew at Dropsie College from 1955–77.

Chomsky was a specialist of the history of the Hebrew grammatical tradition, before and after David Kimhi (1160–1235). His Associated Press obituary (published in The New York Times) describes him as "one of the world's foremost Hebrew grammarians". Independently, he was involved in researching Medieval Hebrew. He published a series of books on the language: How to Teach Hebrew in the Elementary Grades (1946), Hebrew, the Story of a Living Language (1947), Hebrew, the Eternal Language (1957), Teaching and Learning (1959), and an edited version of David Kimhi's Hebrew Grammar (1952).

Described by Carlos Otero in Chomsky and the Libertarian Tradition as a "very warm, gentle, and engaging" individual, William Chomsky placed a great emphasis on educating people so that they would be "well integrated, free and independent in their thinking, and eager to participate in making life more meaningful and worthwhile for all."

== Personal life ==
On August 19, 1927, Chomsky married Elsie Simonofsky (1903–1972), a native of Babruysk, who was raised in the United States from 1906. She also taught at Gratz College. The couple had two sons: Noam (born 1928), the linguist and activist, and David Eli (1934–2021), a physician. The year after his first wife's death, William Chomsky married Ruth Schendel, by then widowed, who was the mother of one of his elder son's childhood friends.

== Death ==
Chomsky died at his home in Philadelphia, Pennsylvania, on July 19, 1977, at the age of 81.

== Selected bibliography ==
- Chomsky, William (1945). "How the Study of Hebrew Grammar Began and Developed". The Jewish Quarterly Review. 35 (3): 281–301. doi:10.2307/1452188. JSTOR 1452188.
- Chomsky, William (1946). How to Teach Hebrew in the Elementary Grades. New York: United Synagogue Commission on Jewish Education.
- Chomsky, William (1952). David Ḳimḥi's Hebrew Grammar (Mikhlol). New York: Bloch Publishing Company.
- Chomsky, William (1957). Hebrew: The Eternal Language. Philadelphia: Jewish Publication Society of America. ISBN 978-0-8276-0077-5. LCCN 57-8140.
