= Oblapy =

Coordinates: 51°20′N 24°42′E

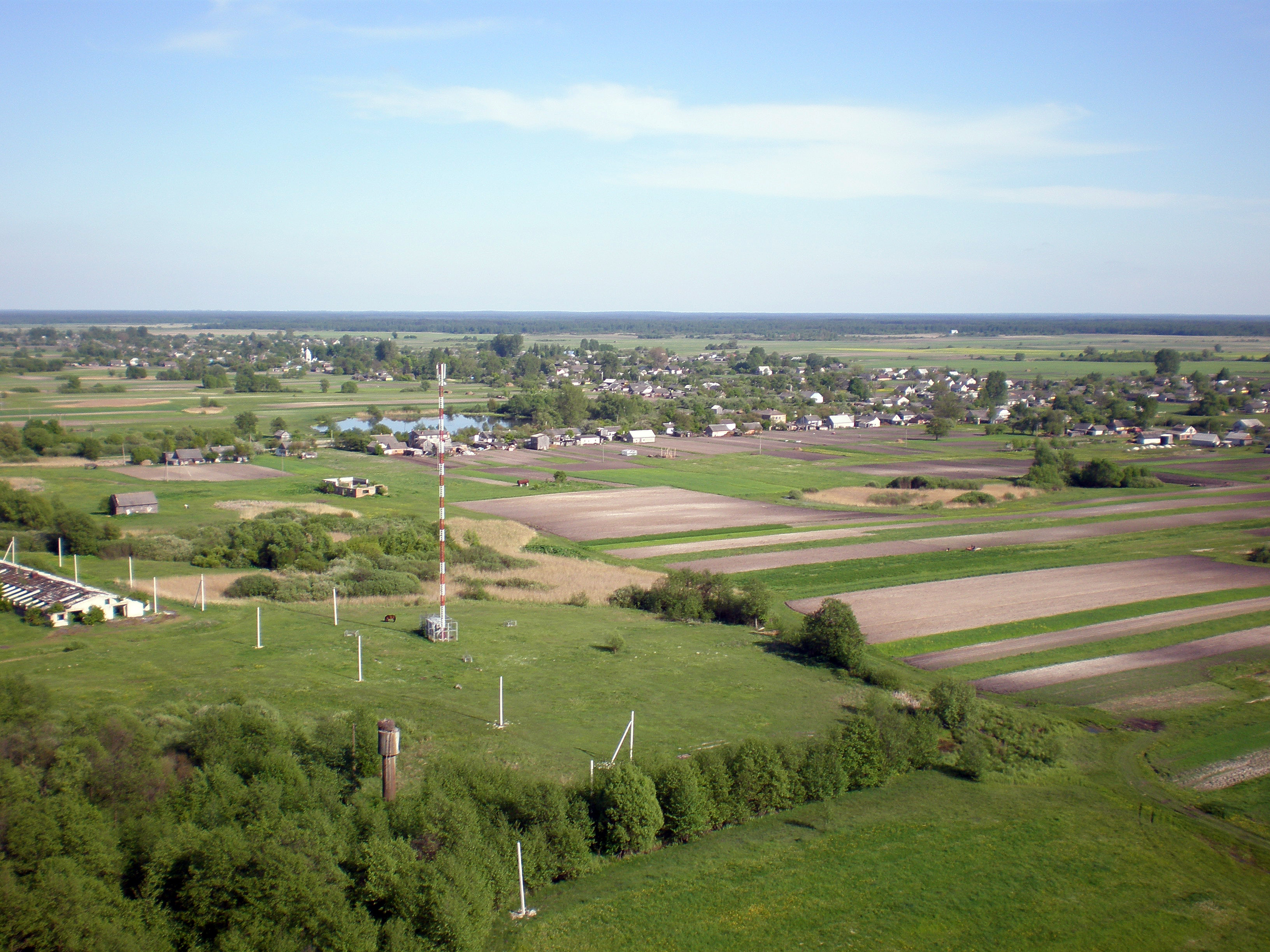

Oblapy (Ukrainian: Облапи; Polish: Obłapy) is a village in Volyn Oblast, located in north-western Ukraine.

== History ==
Oblapy is mentioned as being owned by Andrzej Kurbski upon his death in 1583, it was later owned by the Chołodecki family until 1741 when it was deeded to Józef Rokicki.
