= Viitivtsi =

Rural locality in Khmelnytskyi Oblast, Ukraine

Viitivtsi Війтівці
- Rural settlement
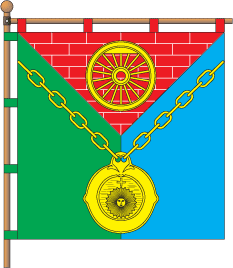
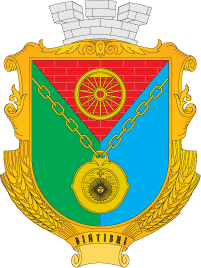
- Flag Coat of arms

- Location within Khmelnytskyi Oblast Location within Ukraine
- Coordinates: 49°29′52″N 26°26′35″E
- Country: Ukraine
- Oblast: Khmelnytskyi Oblast
- Raion: Khmelnytskyi Raion
- Hromada: Viitivtsi settlement hromada
- Founded: 1888
- Town status: 1970

Government
  - Town Head: Vadym Tkachenko

Area
  - Total: 1.80 km^{2} (0.69 sq mi)
- Elevation: 333 m (1,093 ft)

Population (2022)
  - Total: 811 ▼
  - Density: 451/km^{2} (1,170/sq mi)
- Time zone: UTC+2 (EET)
  - Summer (DST): UTC+3 (EEST)
- Postal code: 31256
- Area code: +380 3845
- Website: http://rada.gov.ua/

Viitivtsi (Ukrainian: Війтівці) is a rural settlement in Khmelnytskyi Raion, Khmelnytskyi Oblast, western Ukraine. It hosts the administration of Viitivtsi settlement hromada, one of the hromadas of Ukraine. The settlement's population was 937 as of the 2001 Ukrainian Census. Current population: 811 (2022 estimate).

== History ==
The settlement was founded in 1888 as the settlement of Podilske (Ukrainian: Подільське). It received the status of an urban-type settlement in 1970.

Until 18 July 2020, Viitivtsi belonged to Volochysk Raion. The raion was abolished in July 2020 as part of the administrative reform of Ukraine, which reduced the number of raions of Khmelnytskyi Oblast to three. The area of Volochysk Raion was merged into Khmelnytskyi Raion.

Until 26 January 2024, Viitivtsi was designated urban-type settlement. On this day, a new law entered into force which abolished this status, and Viitivtsi became a rural settlement.
