= Narkevychi =

Rural locality in Khmelnytskyi Oblast, Ukraine

Narkevychi Наркевичі
- Rural settlement
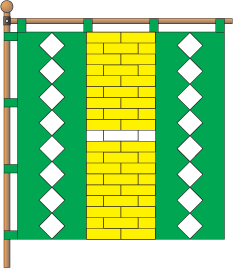
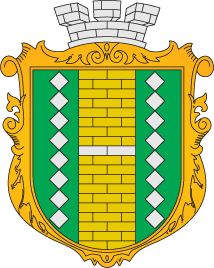
- Flag Coat of arms

- Location within Khmelnytskyi Oblast Location within Ukraine
- Coordinates: 49°31′00″N 26°38′29″E
- Country: Ukraine
- Oblast: Khmelnytskyi Oblast
- Raion: Khmelnytskyi Raion
- Hromada: Narkevychi settlement hromada
- Founded: 1950
- Town status: 1968

Government
  - Town Head: Valentyna Iliushyna

Area
  - Total: 0.66 km^{2} (0.25 sq mi)
- Elevation: 317 m (1,040 ft)

Population (2022)
  - Total: 1,457 ▼
  - Density: 2,200/km^{2} (5,700/sq mi)
- Time zone: UTC+2 (EET)
  - Summer (DST): UTC+3 (EEST)
- Postal code: 31260
- Area code: +380 3845
- Website: http://rada.gov.ua/

Narkevychi (Ukrainian: Наркевичі) is a rural settlement in Khmelnytskyi Raion, Khmelnytskyi Oblast, western Ukraine. It hosts the administration of Narkevychi settlement hromada, one of the hromadas of Ukraine. The settlement's population was 1,708 as of the 2001 Ukrainian Census. Current population: 1,457 (2022 estimate).

== History ==
The settlement was founded in 1950 as the settlement of Yasne (Ukrainian: Ясне). It received the status of an urban-type settlement in 1968. In 1994, the town of Yasne was renamed to Narkevychi.

Until 18 July 2020, Narkevychi belonged to Volochysk Raion. The raion was abolished in July 2020 as part of the administrative reform of Ukraine, which reduced the number of raions of Khmelnytskyi Oblast to three. The area of Volochysk Raion was merged into Khmelnytskyi Raion.

On 26 January 2024, a new law entered into force which abolished this status, and Narkevychi became a rural settlement.
