= Volochysk =

City in Khmelnytskyi Oblast, Ukraine

Volochysk Волочиськ Wołoczyska
- City
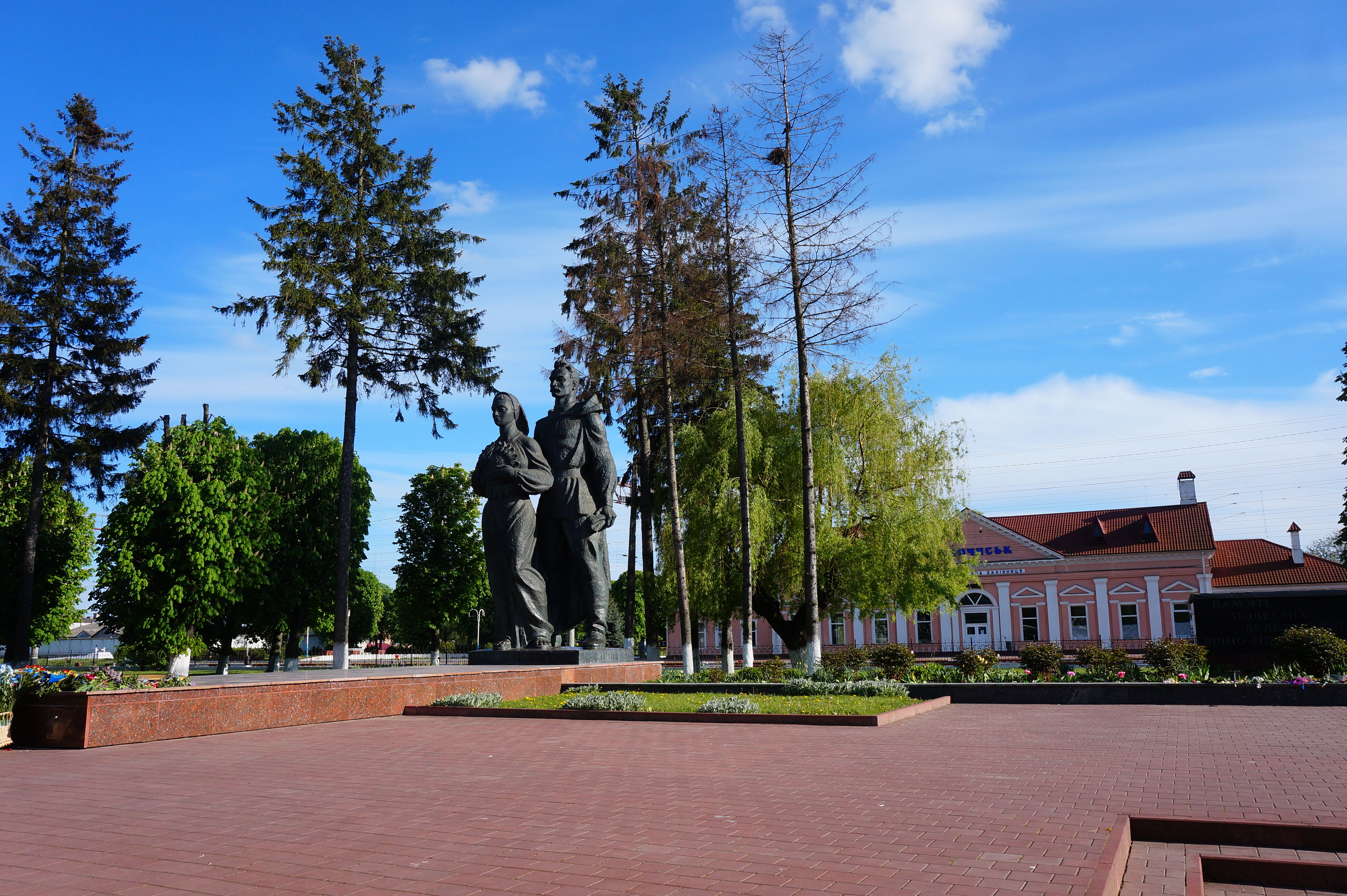
- WW2 memorial in front of Volochysk railway station

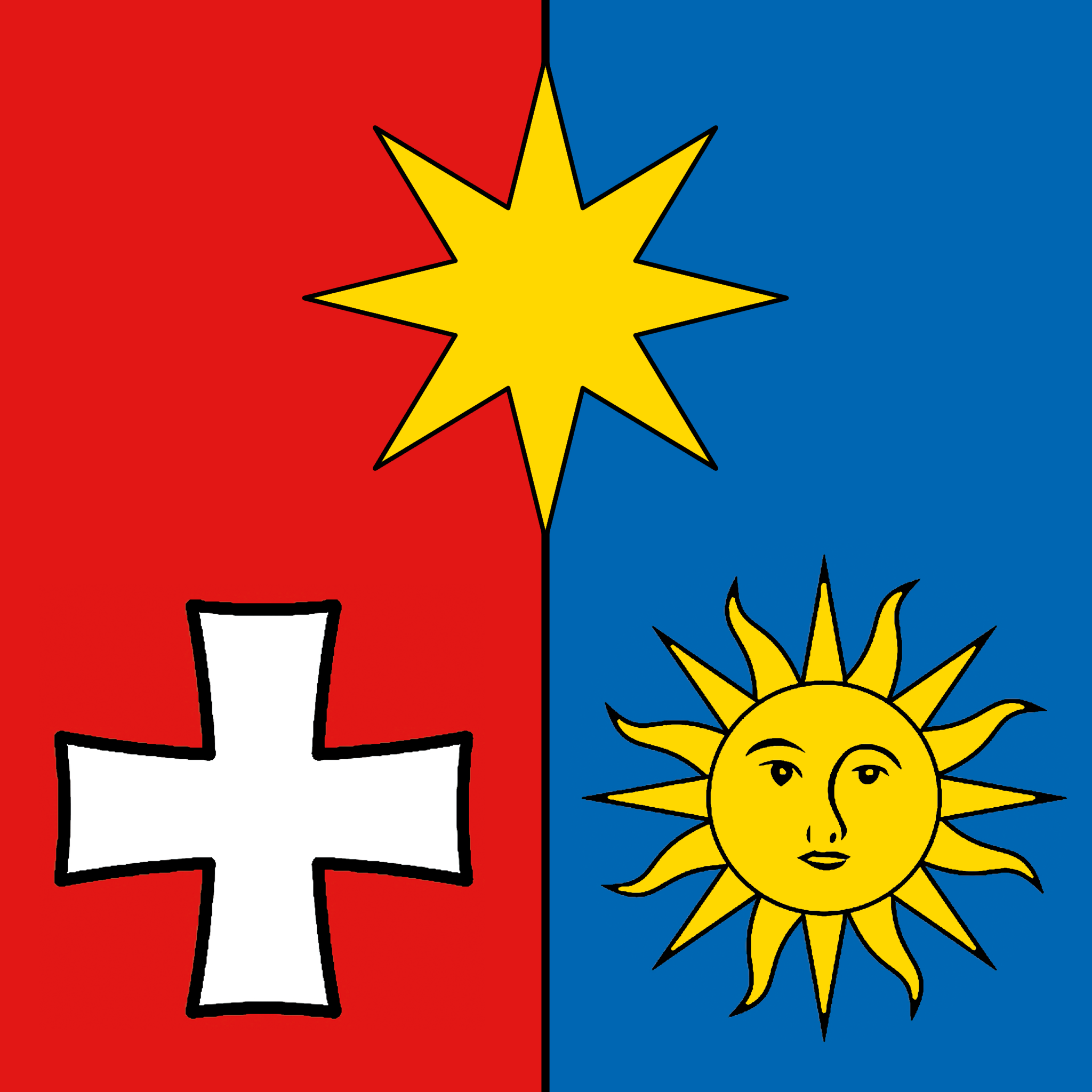
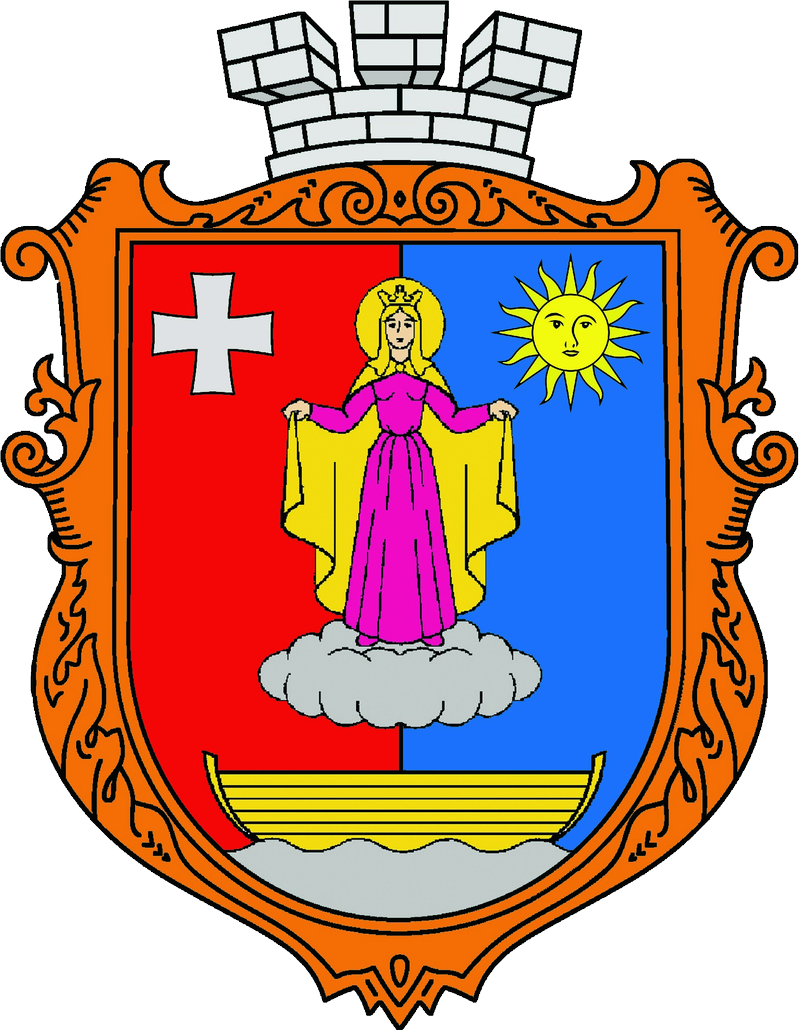
- Flag Coat of arms
- Interactive map of Volochysk
- Location within Khmelnytskyi Oblast Location within Ukraine
- Coordinates: 49°32′N 26°10′E
- Country: Ukraine
- Oblast: Khmelnytskyi Oblast
- Raion: Khmelnytskyi Raion
- Hromada: Volochysk urban hromada

Area
  - Total: 14.61 km^{2} (5.64 sq mi)
- Elevation: 311 m (1,020 ft)

Population (2022)
  - Total: 18,295
  - Density: 1,252/km^{2} (3,243/sq mi)
- Time zone: UTC+2 (EET)
  - Summer (DST): UTC+3 (EEST)
- Postal code: 31200 – 31208
- Area code: +380 3845
- Website: http://www.volochisk.info

Volochysk (Ukrainian: Волочиськ, IPA: [woloˈtʃɪsʲk]; Polish: Wołoczyska; Yiddish: וואָלאָטשיסק) is a small city located on the left bank of the Zbruch River in Khmelnytskyi Raion, Khmelnytskyi Oblast (province) of western Ukraine. It hosts the administration of Volochysk urban hromada, one of the hromadas of Ukraine. The population according to the 2001 census was 20958. Current population is 18,295 (2022 estimate).

Located on the left bank of Zbruch, the city along with its vis-a-vis Pidvolochysk on the opposite bank of the river was an important border checkpoint between Russia and the countries of Central Europe. Volochysk is an important transport center. Railroads and highways of national importance go through the town.

Volochysk is located on E50/ M 12 between Ternopil and Khmelnytskyi. In the city is located a train station which is a final stop of Southwestern Railways before continuing to territory of Lviv Railways.

== History ==
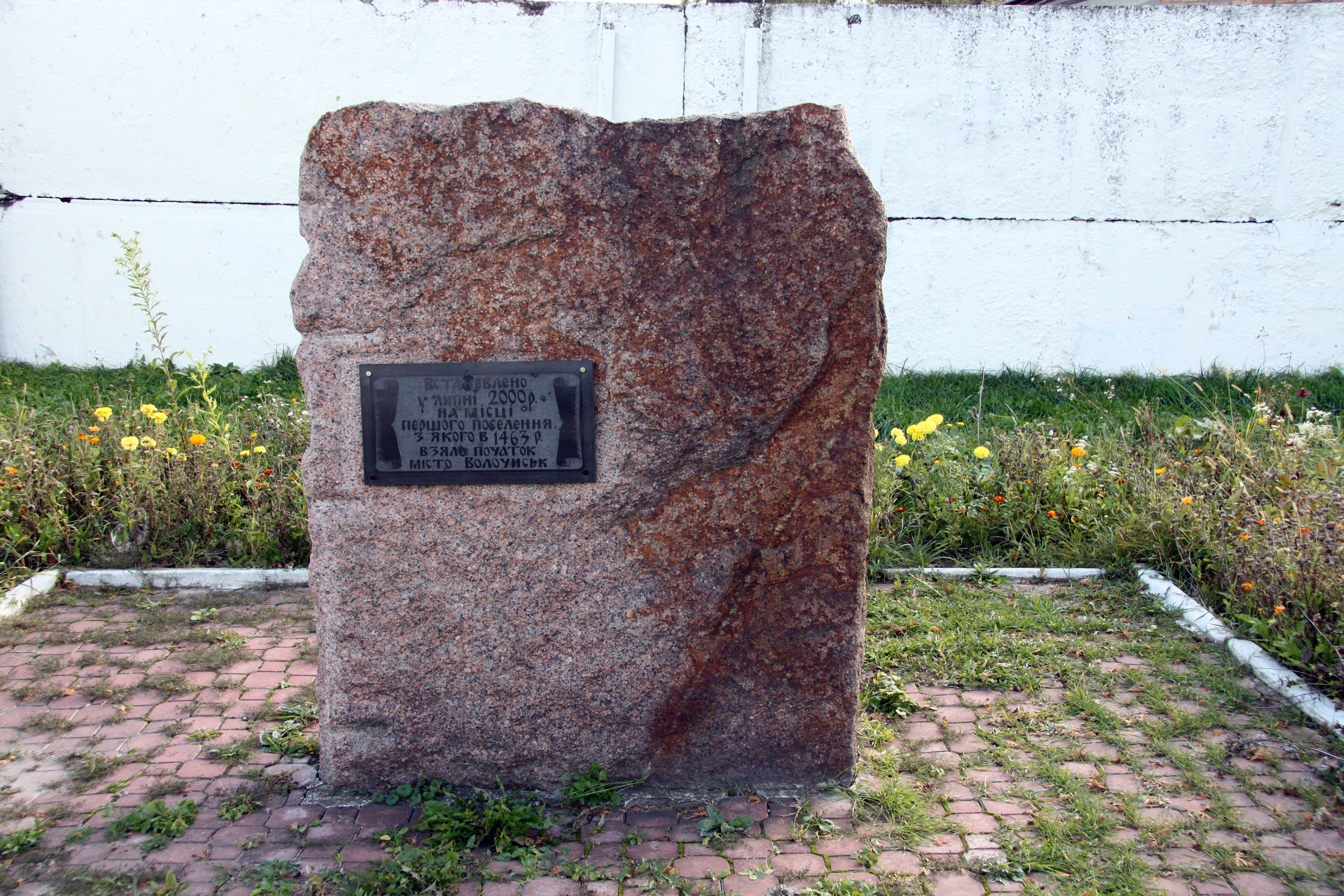
Site of the first building in Volochysk

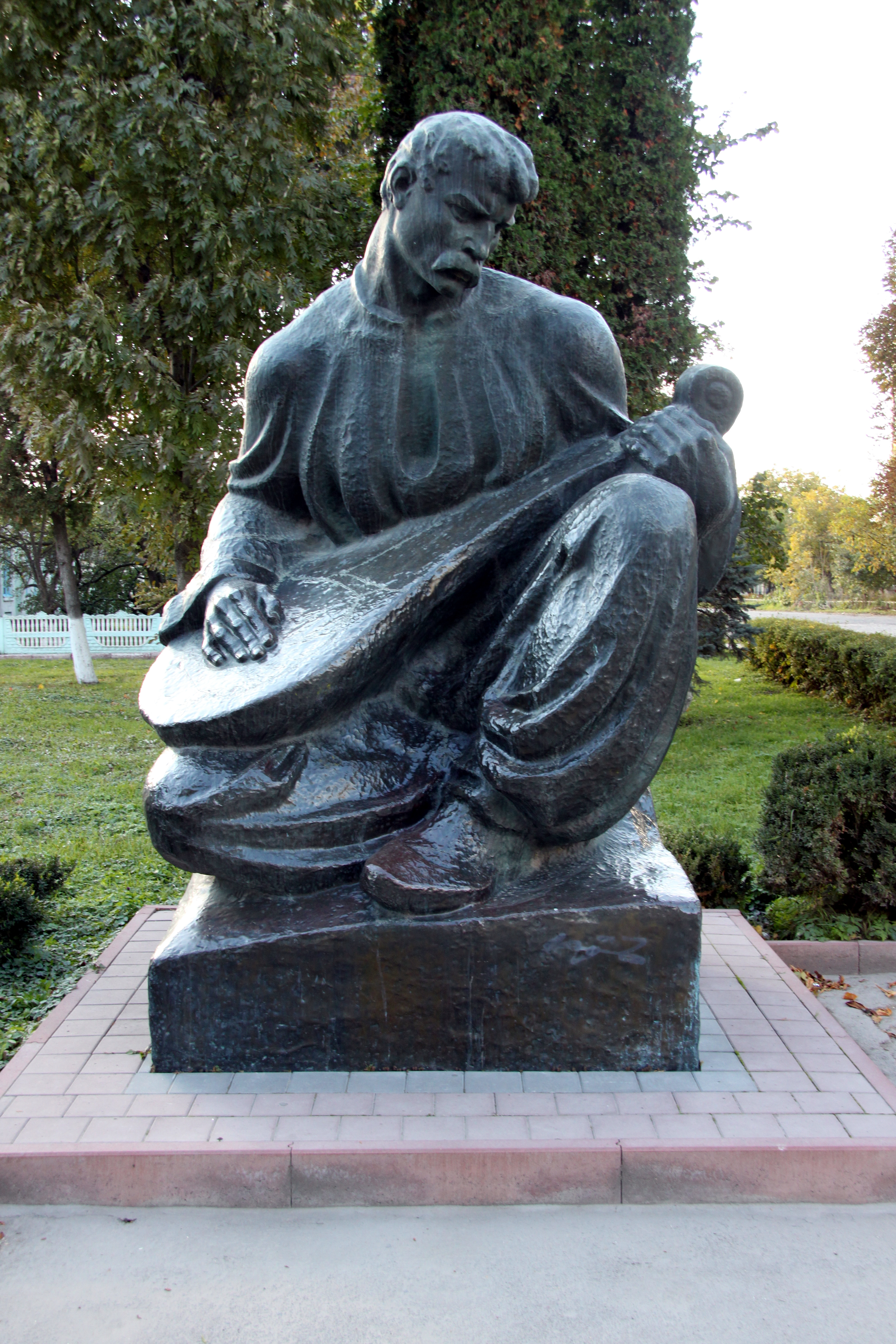
Kobzar monument in Volochysk

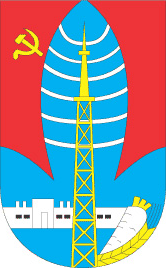
Soviet coat of arms

Volochysk is first mentioned as early as July 9, 1463 as Volochyshche. It derives from Ukrainian word volochyty that means “to portage”. The town situated on the trade road from the East to the West in Halytsko-Volyn Principality time and in the following centuries. Merchants had to portage their goods through the river and its waterlogged banks. As a result, a new settlement appeared on that place soon (on left and right banks of river Zbruch). It was called “Volochyshche”. The settlement on the right bank was later renamed to “Pidvolochysk”, which means “the place near or under Volochysk”. In 1545 the settlement adopted its current name.

Slavic tribes of volyniany used to live on the territory of contemporary Volochysk in ancient times. This region belonged to Kyivan Rus' in the ninth and tenth centuries, later to Halytsko-Volyn Principality.

Volochysk area was ravaged in 1241 by Mongol-tatar tribes, which were coming to conquer Halych after they had seized Kyiv. Volochysk region as a part of Halytsko-Volyn Princedom was conquered by the Grand Duchy of Lithuania in the second quarter of the 14th century. Volochysk was a part of Kuzmynsky povit (district) in that period of time. Soon afterwards, it became part of the Kingdom of Poland.

Volochysk is first mentioned as “Volochyshche” in Podil statement of Zbarazh princes dated 9 July 1463. Volochyshche belonged to Volyn baron, prince Vasyl Zbarazky, but after his death was inherited by his son Semen Zbarazky in 1463. There was a “black road” not far from Volochysk in the southern part of that region. It was one of the main roads for tatars raids into the Polish-Lithuanian Commonwealth. Kuzmynsky powiat was vastly ravaged by the Crimean horde at the end of the 15th century. Only few settlements survived.

The welfare of Volochysk (which was then known in Polish as Woloczysk) grew after its people started trading with other towns of the area. Landlord prince Wladyslaw Zbaraski received the right from the government to establish a village in the area of the settlement in 1557 and since 1558 Volochysk was called a village. There were 135 households with 675 people. Volochysk became a trade-craftsmen community. Zbaraski family died out after Jerzy Zbaraski died and thus Volochysk was inherited by the Wisniowiecki princes in 1631.

The cossacks of Bohdan Khmelnytsky cast off the Polish yoke and captured Volochysk, when they defeated Polish Army in the Battle of Pyliavtsi in 1648. Volochysk wasn't annexed to Russia in 1654. It was still a part of Poland due to the Treaty of Zboriv. After the Wisniowiecki family died out, their relative, governor of Kijów Voivodship (Kyiv), Jozef Potocki inherited Volochysk in 1695.

Potocki sold Volochysk together with all his estates to the Polish crown marshal Fryderyk Jozef Moszynski for 1700 thousand zlotys in 1772. Moszynski was one of the richest Polish landlords, who owned 4,510,000 acres (1,825,132 ha) of land, 30,682 serfs, many shops and factories. He established a bank in Volochysk at the end of the 18th century. He also built a five-storey castle, a school, and also built another castle 3 miles (4.8 km) to the east of the village, thus established a new settlement which was named after him – Fridrikhivka (Frydrychowka). There were already 58 households in Fridrikhivka in 1866. But it was already the Russian Empire. In 1793, the second partition of the Polish-Lithuanian Commonwealth took place. According to its terms, the lands of right-bank Ukraine and the central part of White Russia were ceded. And on March 27 of the same year, Empress Catherine II issued a manifesto on the admission of these territories and their population to her citizenship.

The population of the village was illiterate at the beginning of the 19th century, because there were no schools till that time. The first grade school was established there only in 1801, but only children of rich people studied there. A number of manufacturing enterprises appeared in Volochysk in the second part of the 19th century. There was a brewery and a candle plant in 1860. A sugar plant owned by German venture “Zbruch” was built in 1870.

A railway from Kyiv to Lviv and a railway station were built here in 1871. It was the first railroad joining current Western and Eastern Ukraine, and a key transit point for grain export from Galicia to the port city of Odessa. There were no hospitals in Volochysk before the revolution. Only 4 medical attendants, 5 dentists and 4 midwives worked there in 1913. Volochysk was at the front line during World War I.

Though not a big city, Volochysk was a famous place because Volochysk was the "gate" to Ukraine (from the West), the so-called "box of goodies" between Europe and Asia. There were 190 private shops in 1913. 261 students studied in a one-, and a two-year schools, and also in a church school. Among the cultural establishments in Volochysk, there were a club, a cinema, two libraries and three book shops in 1913.

Many armies passed through Volochysk in the period from 1917 to 1920, when Ukraine gained its independence from Russia for a short period of time. They represented different powers: Russian Bolsheviks, the Polish army of Józef Piłsudski, Ukrainian Central Council (Tsentralna Rada) and Dyrektoriya headed by Symon Petliura. In November 1920, the army of headed by Symon Petliura was defeated by the 8th Division of the Red Army near Volochysk. Thus, the military struggle for Ukrainian independence was over and Volochysk became a part of the Soviet Union.

From 1923 Volochysk served as the administrative centre of Volochyskyi rayon (district). The process of “collectivization” (when individual land and labour were consolidated into collective farms by force) was one of the fastest in the region. As the result, big numbers of people were oppressed and sent to concentration camps in Siberia in 1930–1931. The first library for adults opened in the city 1934, and a library for children was opened in 1937. Local newspaper Prykordonnyi Komunar (Ukrainian for "Borderline Communar") was established in 1930. Now it's called Zorya and is still published.

In July 1941 German troops marched into the town. They occupied the town until March, 1944. In August 1942, 8634 Jews were shot dead by Nazis near Volochysk. All together during the period of the Second World War, there were 9297 people killed in the town and 3982 were taken to Germany for forced labour. On 17 March 1944 Volochysk was freed by the Soviet Army. Right after that the processes of rebuilding the town started. Most of the plants and factories restored their full functionality by the 1950s.

Great changes came to the town's industrial and socio-cultural development in the 1960s. A canned food plant, a clothes factory, capacitors, brick, metal items, and bread plants were built then. The development of the town also continued in the 1970s. A cheese plant and a machine-building plant were opened then. As of today the core production in the region consists of portable electric power stations, bricks, metal items, capacitors, canned food, sugar, bread and bun goods, and more than 100 of other consumer products. Volochysk is developing with rapid strides, paying much attention to the service sector and new technologies.

Until 18 July 2020, Volochysk was the administrative center of Volochysk Raion. The raion was abolished in July 2020 as part of the administrative reform of Ukraine, which reduced the number of raions of Khmelnytskyi Oblast to three. The area of Volochysk Raion was merged into Khmelnytskyi Raion.

== Economy ==
- Volochysk engineering factory, a branch of Motor Sich
- Ahrobiznes, agrarian company
  - FC Ahrobiznes Volochysk, a professional football club

== Gallery ==
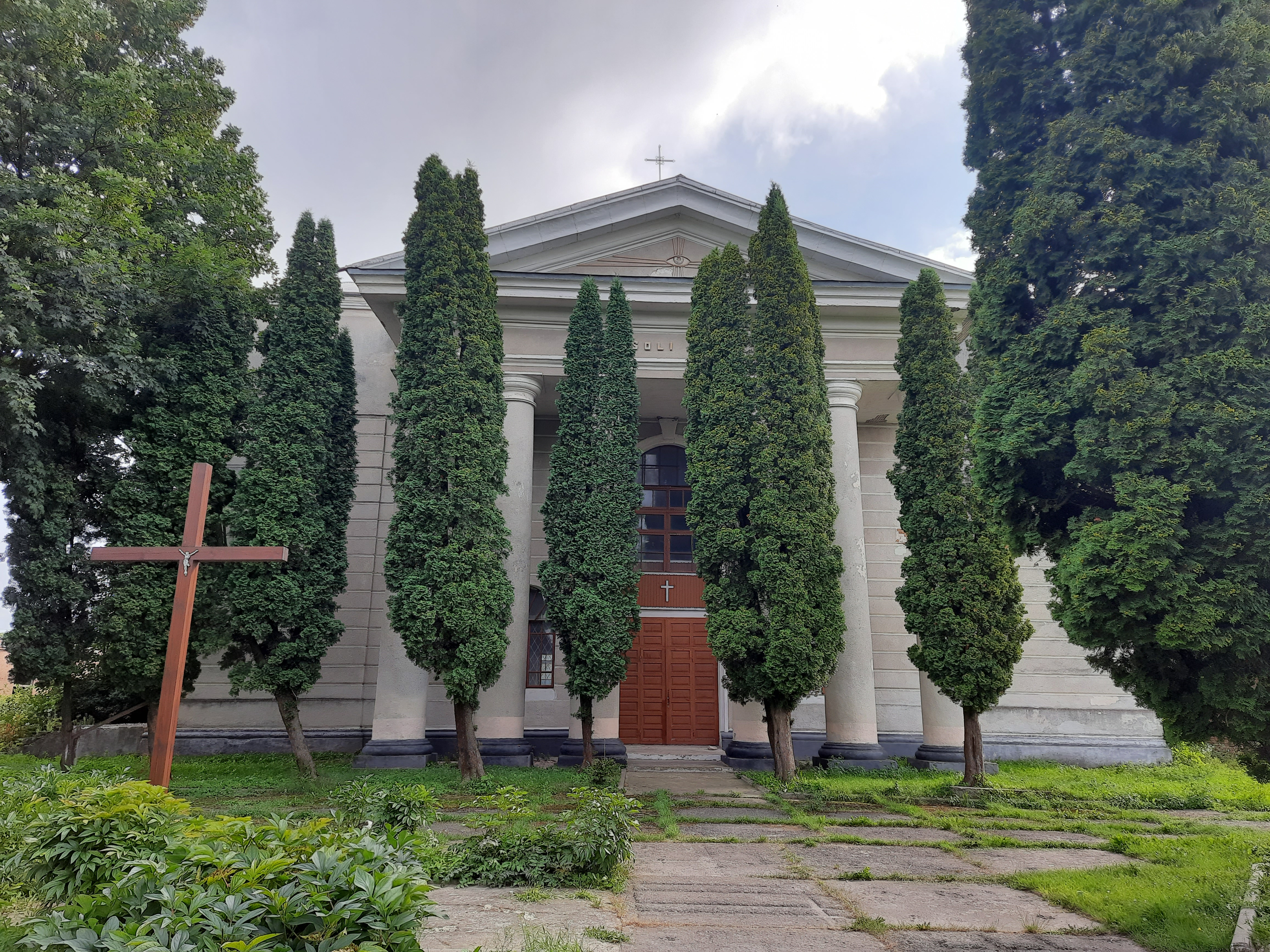
Catholic church of the Holy Trinity

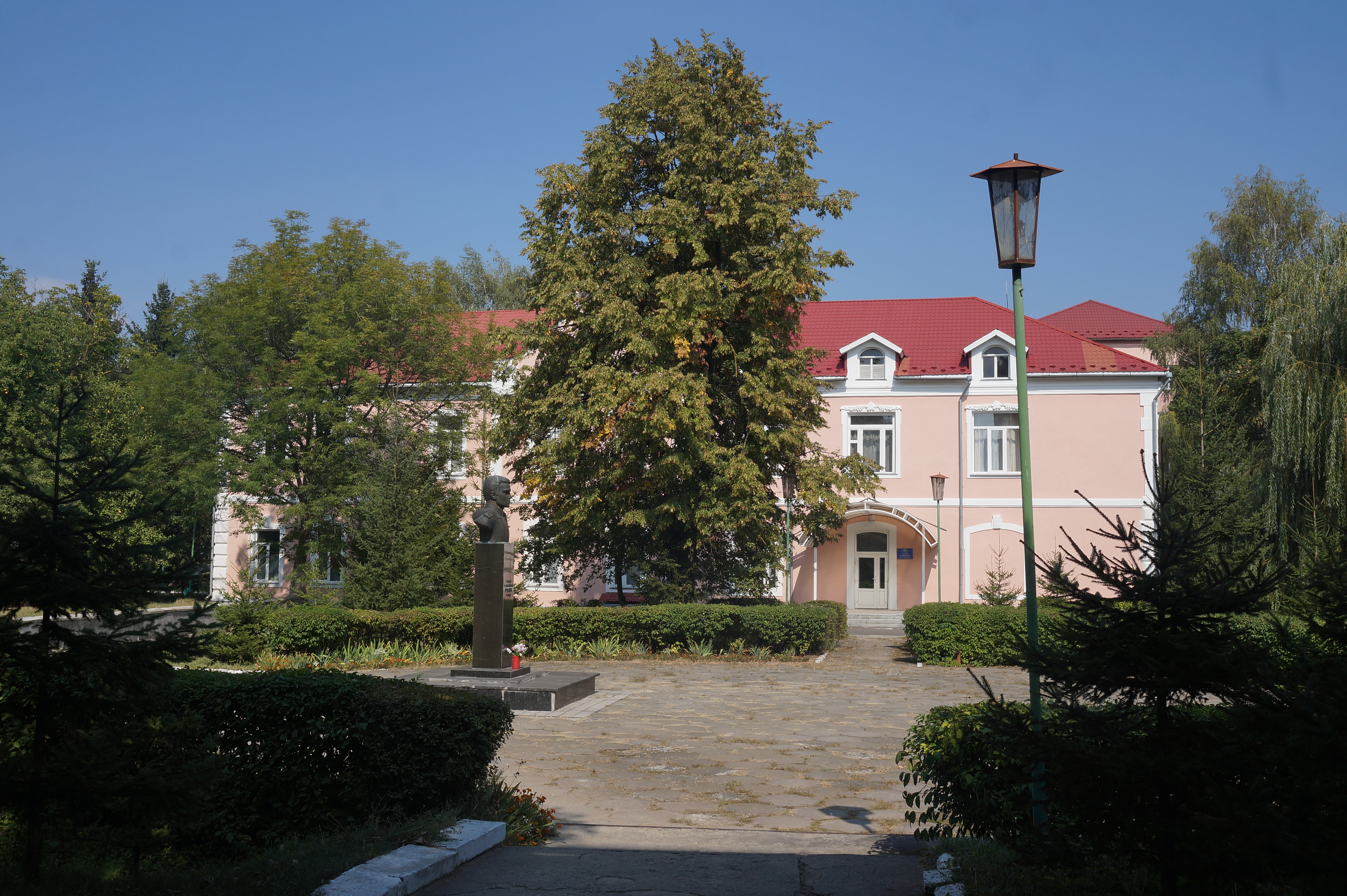
Former palace, now a sanatorium

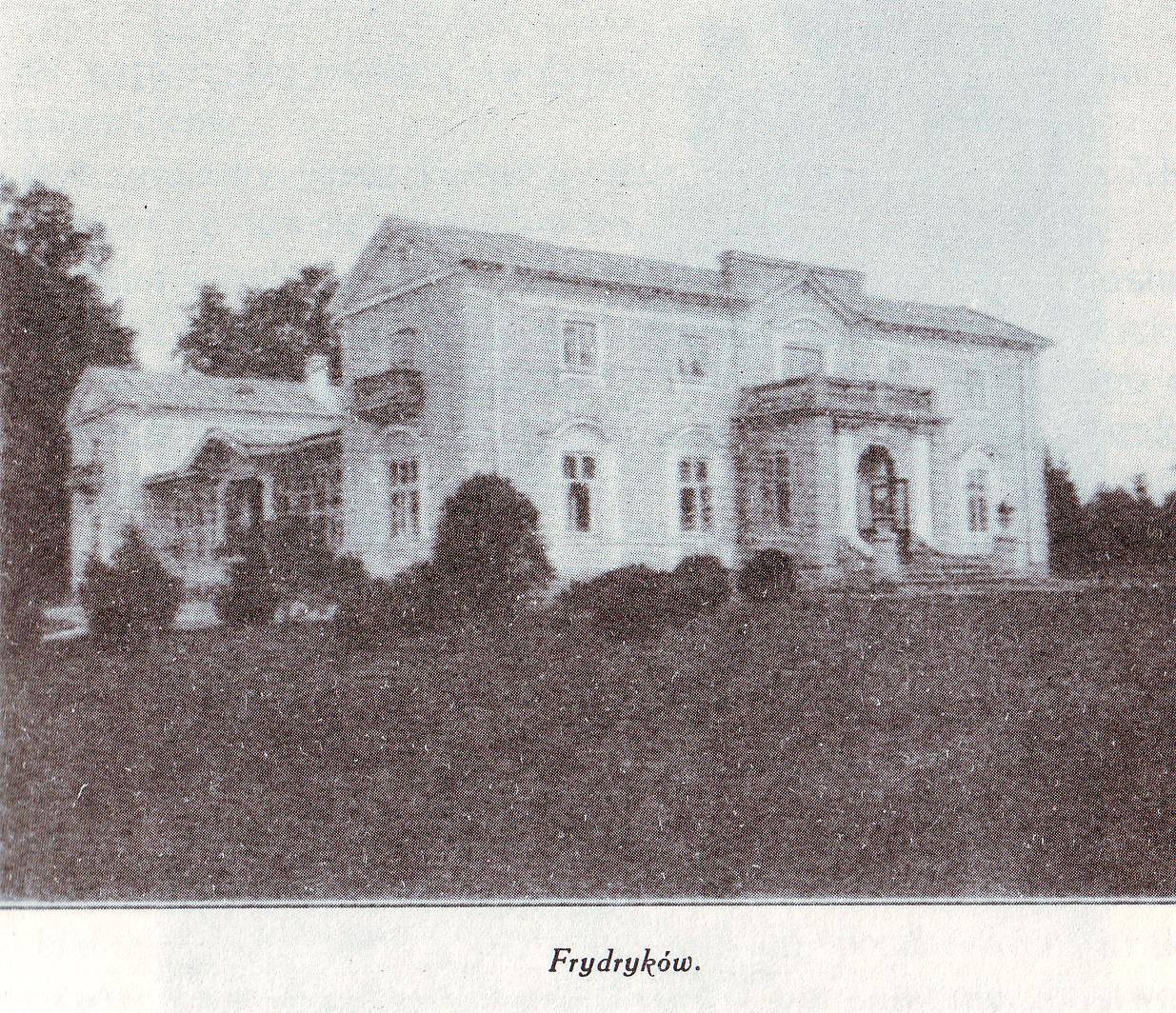
Historical photo of the palace

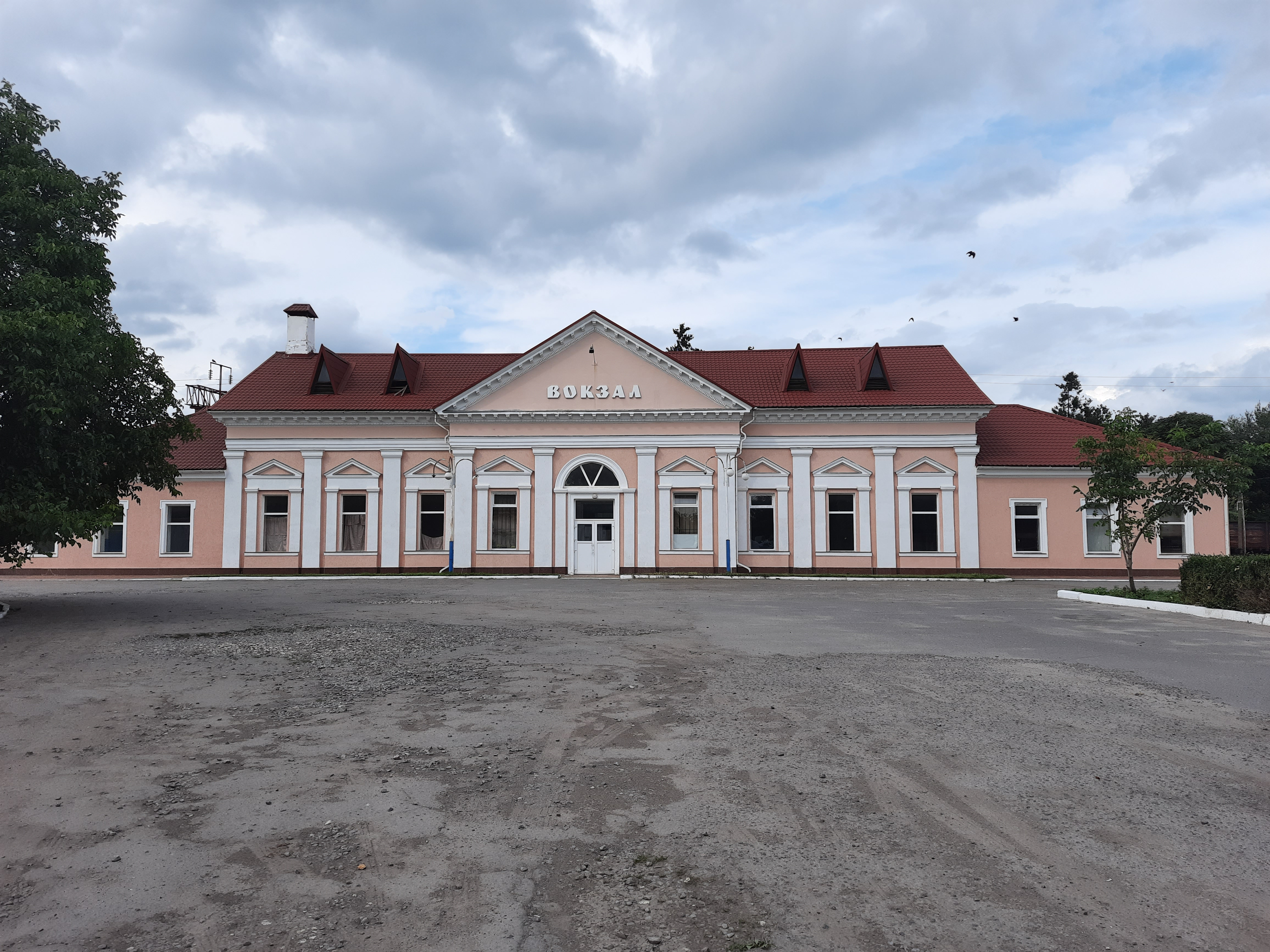
Railway station

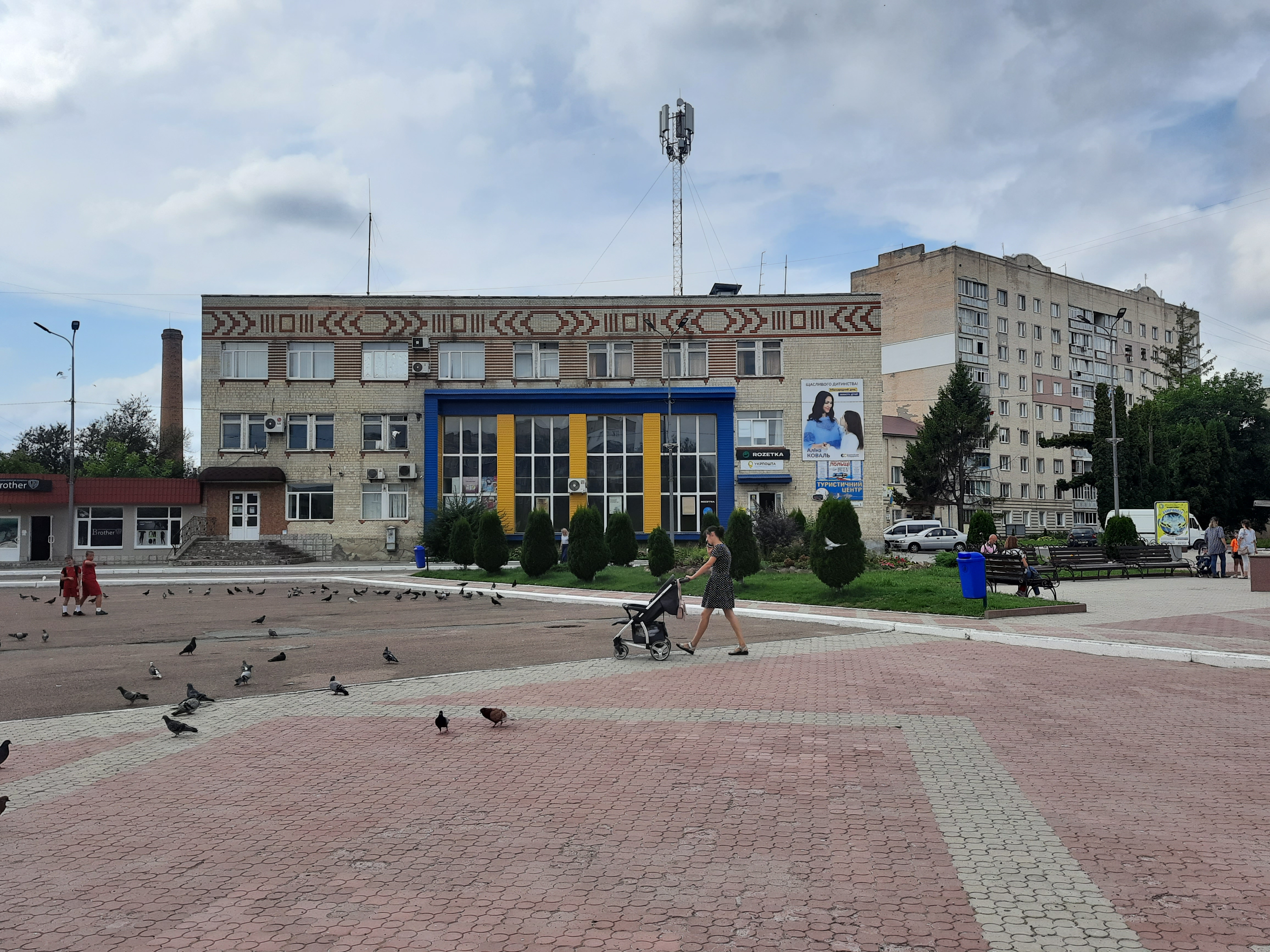
A square in the city centre

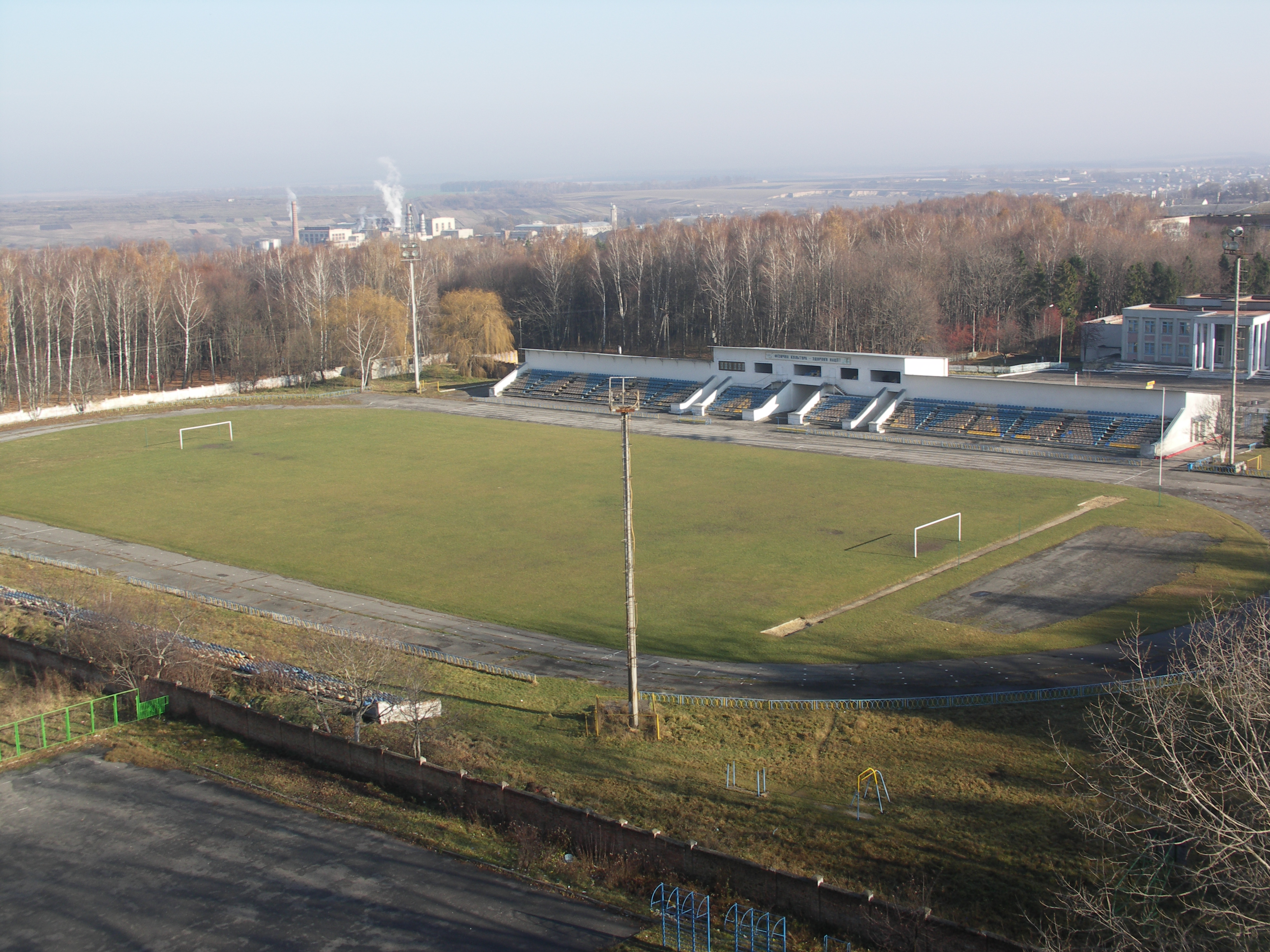
Yunist ("Youth") stadium

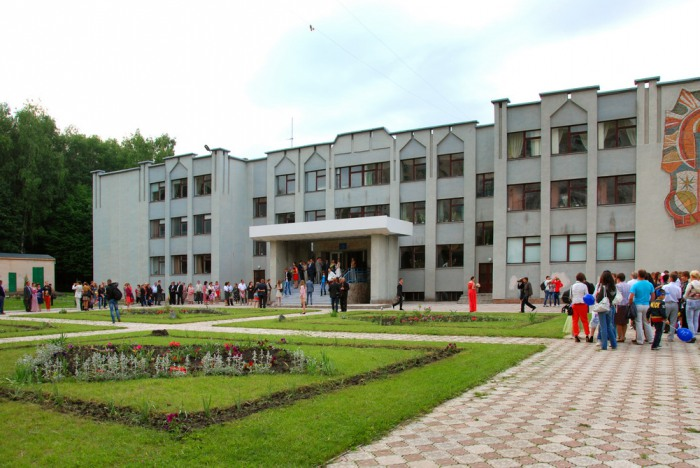
School complex

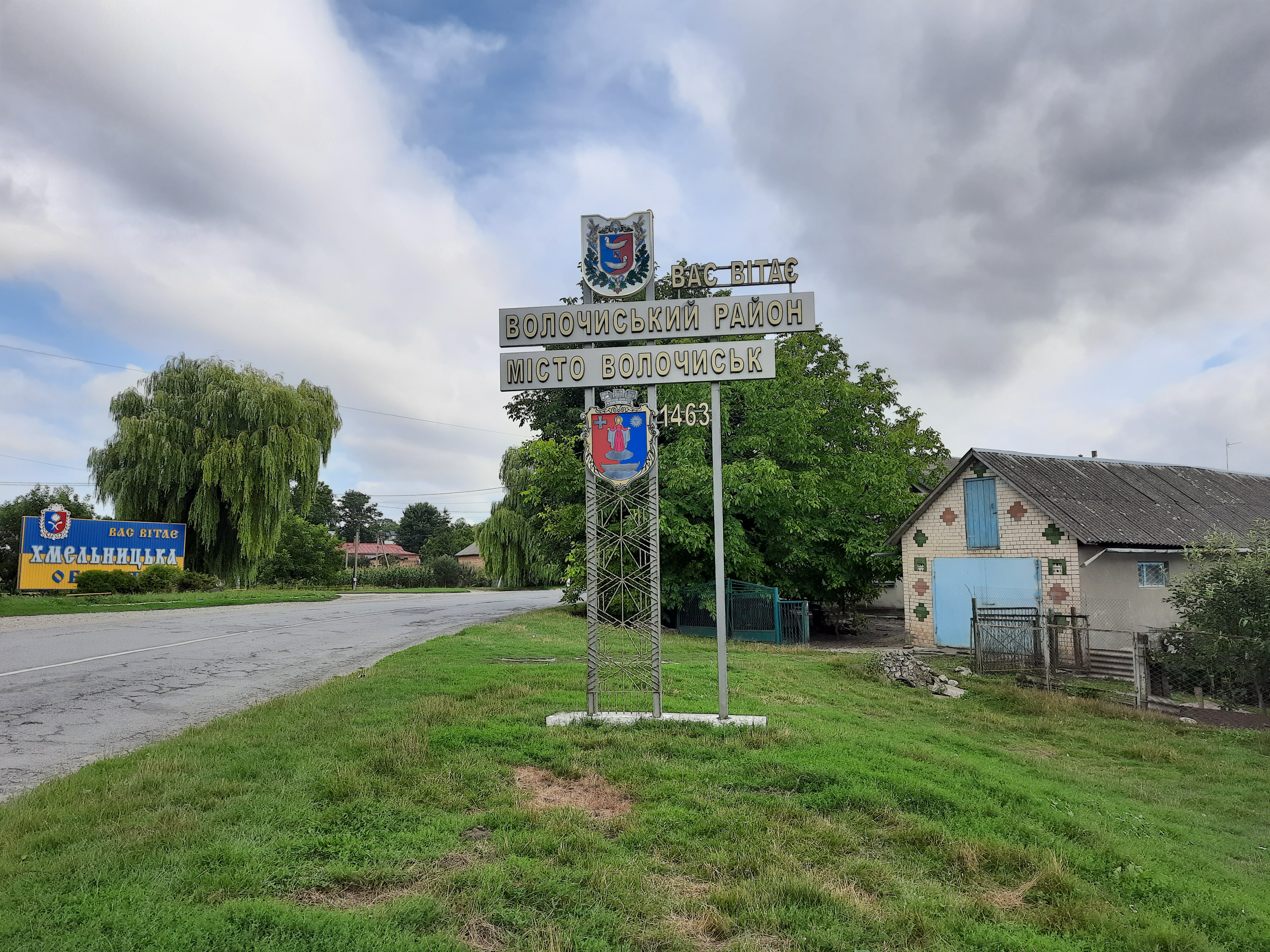
City entrance sign

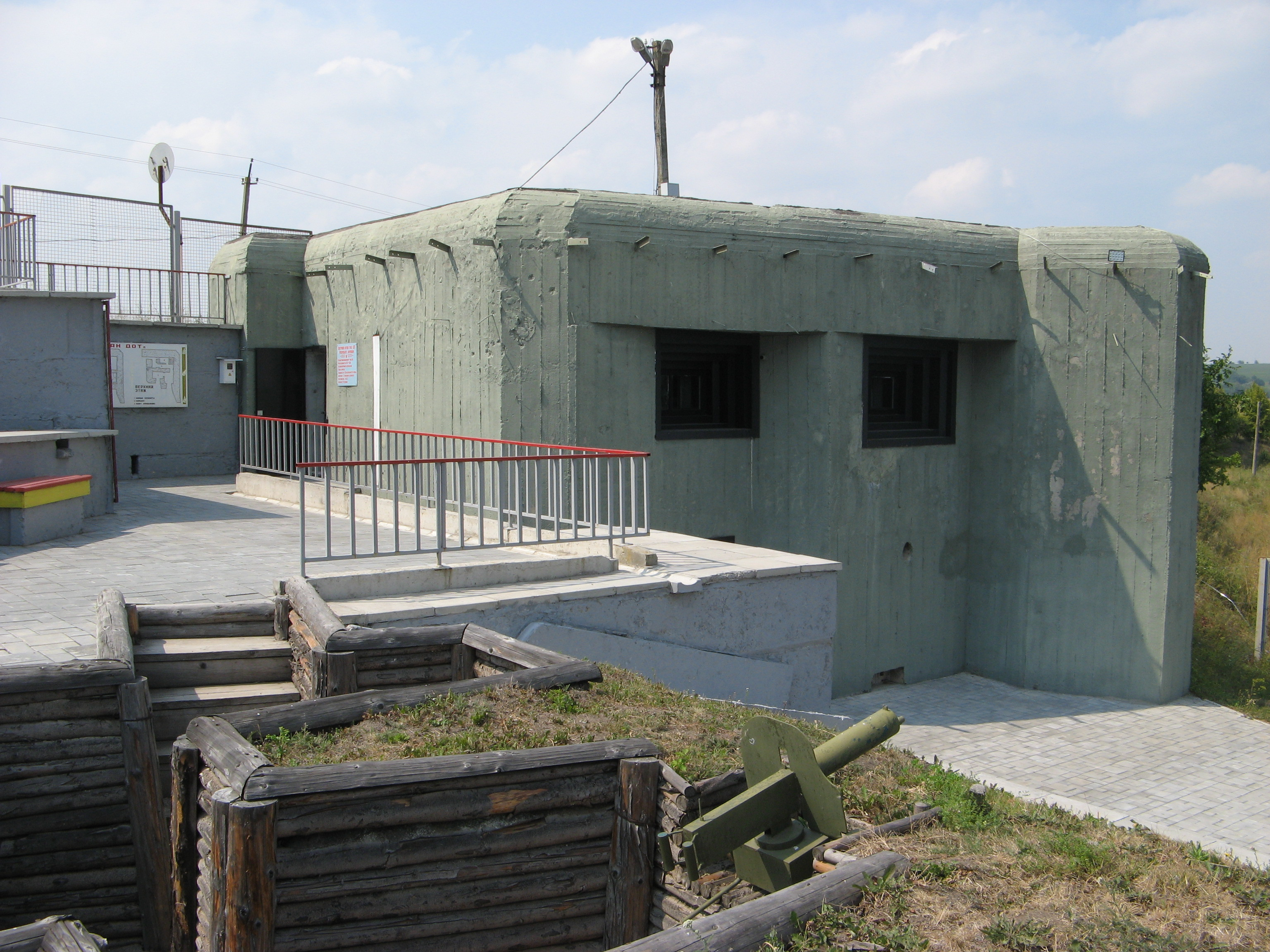
A pillbox in the local military museum

== Notable people ==
- Rabbi Meïr Löb ben Jehiel Michel Weiser, Malbi"M
- Nadia Meikher
- David Margolis (artist)
- Samuel Mitja Rapoport, biochemist, born in Volochysk
