= Bardzilauskas =

- Lithuanian surname
- m.: Bardzilauskas, Burdzilauskas
- f.: (unmarried): Bardzilauskaitė, Burdzilauskaitė
- f.: (married): Bardzilauskienė, Burdzilauskienė
- Related names: Bordzilowski, Bardzilouski, Bordzilovskiy, Burdziłowski, Burdzilovskiy, Burdzilouski

Bardzilauskas or Burdzilauskas is a Lithuanian-language surname derived from nicknames Bardys and Burda (later adaptations: Bardzila/Burdzila). It is sometimes spelled Bardilauskas or Barzilauskas within generations. Notable people with the surname include:

- Carl Barzilauskas (1951–2023), American football player
- Fritz Barzilauskas (1920–1990), American football player
- Ernestas Burdzilauskas
- Tautvydas Burdzilauskas
