= Volochysk urban hromada =

Volochysk rural hromada Володиська міська громада
- Hromada
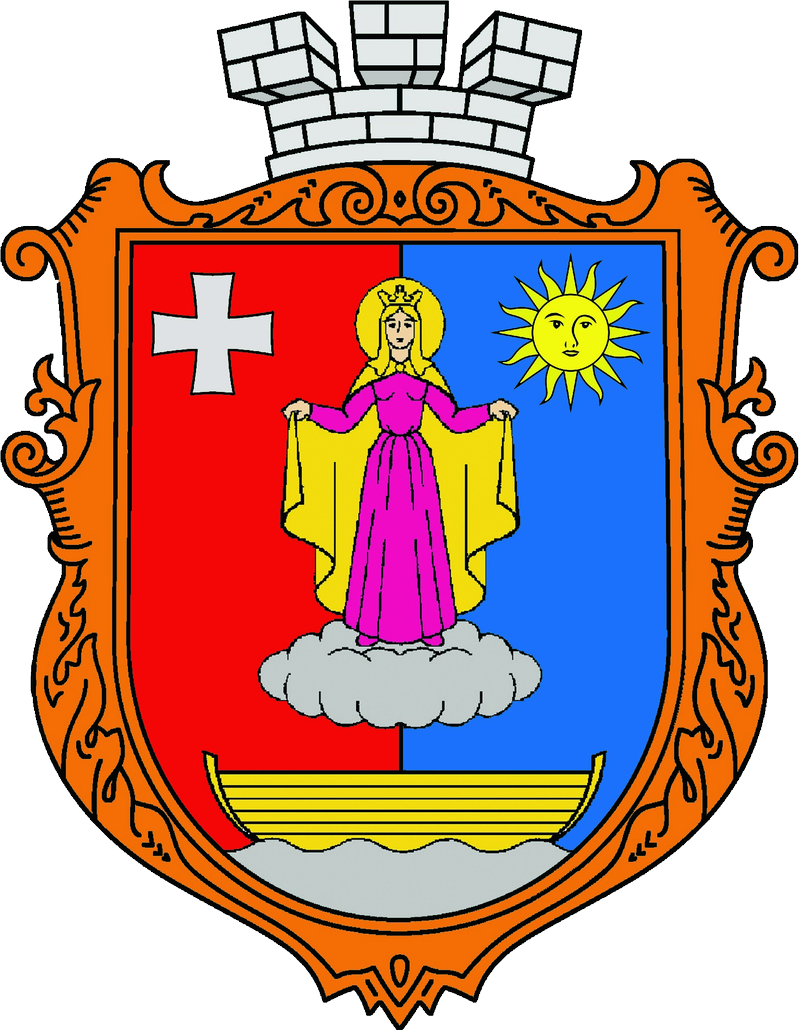
- Seal
- Interactive map of Volochysk rural hromada
- Country: Ukraine
- Oblast: Khmelnytskyi Oblast
- Raion: Khmelnytskyi Raion
- Founded: 2015

Area
  - Total: 619.7 km^{2} (239.3 sq mi)

Population (2020)
  - Total: 35,806
- Website: volochyska-gromada.gov.ua

Volochysk urban hromada (Ukrainian: Волочиська міська громада) is a hromada in Khmelnytskyi Raion of Khmelnytskyi Oblast in Ukraine. Its administrative centre is the city of Volochysk.

== History ==
The hromada was created in 2015 as part of the administrative reform in Ukraine. Initially it included the city of Volochysk and 40 settlements from 17 village councils. In 2018 and 2020 four communities (hromadas) with a total of 12 settlements joined the Volochysk hromada.

== Administrative divisions ==
The hormada consists of 53 localities, including the city of Volochysk (administrative centre) and 52 villages:

- Avratyn
- Balkivtsi
- Bohdanivka
- Butivtsi
- Chukheli
- Fedirky
- Harnyshivka
- Honorivka
- Hrechana
- Ivanivka
- Ivanivtsi
- Kanivka
- Kholodets
- Klynyny
- Kopachivka
- Korystova
- Kurylivka
- Kushnirivka
- Kushnirivska Slobidka
- Kut
- Levkivtsi
- Lisove
- Lonky
- Lozova
- Manachyn
- Myrivka
- Myslova
- Nova Hreblia
- Ostriv
- Ozhyhivtsi
- Palchyntsi
- Petrivka
- Petrivshchyna
- Poliany
- Popivtsi
- Postolivka
- Ratsiborivka
- Riabiivka
- Ripna
- Serbyniv
- Shchasnivka
- Sluch
- Sobolivka
- Solomna
- Tarnoruda
- Velyki Zherebky
- Vilshany
- Vochkivtsi
- Vyhoda
- Yakhnivtsi
- Zaichyky
- Zbruchivka

== Economy ==
Enterprises located on the territory of Volochysk hromada include companies active in agriculture, machine building, construction, food, and textile industries, as well as recreation and tourism.

== Transport ==
The hromada's administrative centre is located on an equal distance from the regional cities of Ternopil and Khmelnytskyi and is connected to the Ukrainian highway and railway systems.

== Social sphere ==
18 schools, 16 kindergartens, a sports school, sports and arts centres, an inclusivity centre, 36 clubs and 27 libraries, a historical and ethnographic museum, 9 hospitals, 4 maternity wards and 21 first aid stations are located on the hromada's territory.

== Demographics ==
The hromada's population was 34,226 as of 2022.
