= Bubnivka =

Village in Vinnytsia Oblast, Ukraine

Bubnivka Бубнівка
- Village
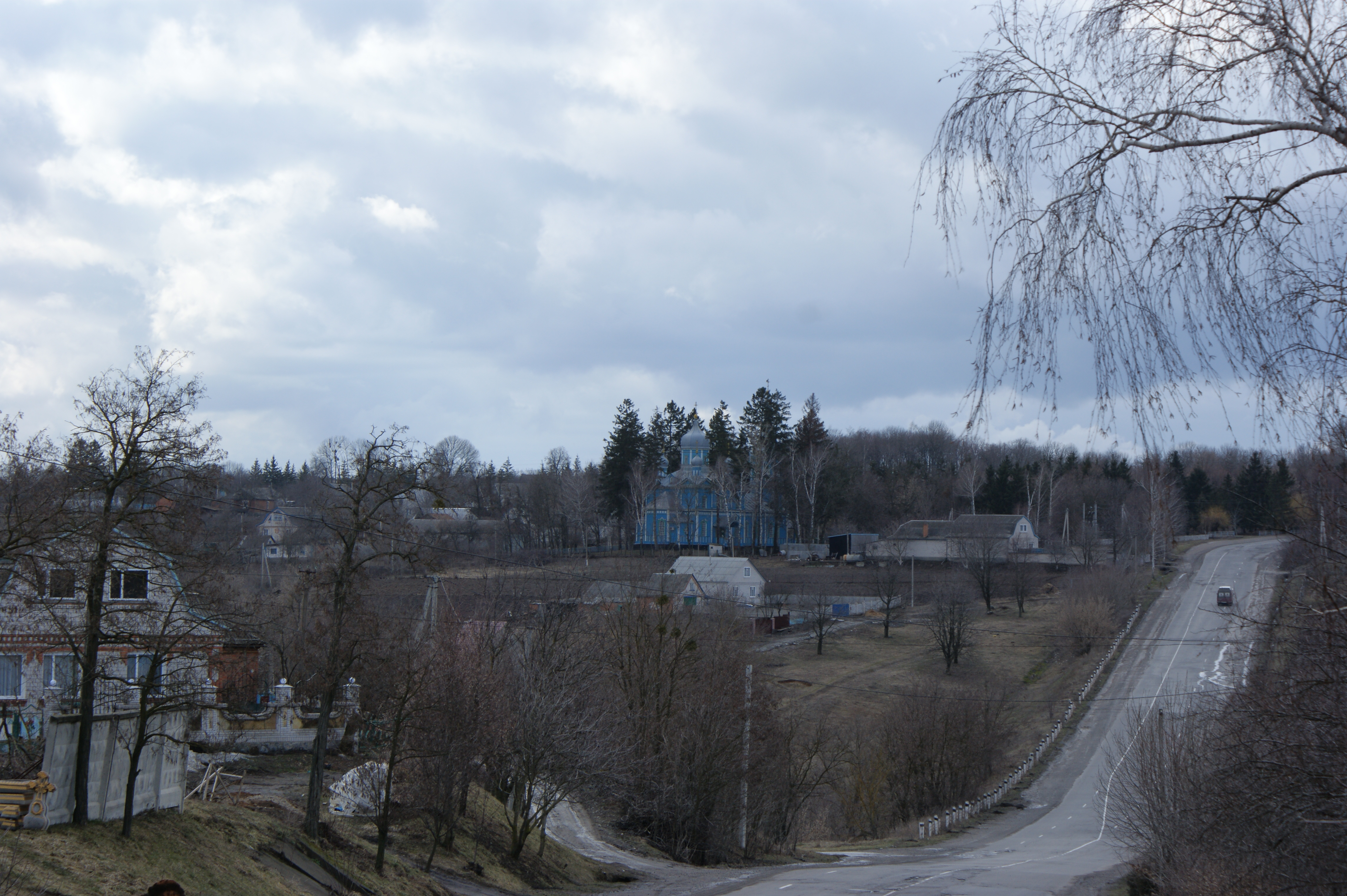
- Trinity Church and its surroundings

- Location within Ukraine Location within Vinnytsia Oblast
- Coordinates: 48°43′16″N 29°18′33″E
- Country: Ukraine
- Oblast: Vinnytsia Oblast
- Raion: Haisyn Raion
- Hromada: Haisyn urban hromada

Population (2001)
  - Total: 941
- Time zone: UTC+2 (EET)
  - Summer (DST): UTC+3 (EEST)
- Postal code: 23744
- Area code: +380 4334

Bubnivka (Ukrainian: Бубнівка) is a village in Haisyn Raion, Vinnytsia Oblast, Ukraine. The village is primarily known for its type of ceramics, known as Bubnivka ceramics, which is included in the National Register of Intangible Cultural Heritage. As of the 2001 Ukrainian census, the village has a population of 941 people.

== History ==
Bubnivka was mentioned as early as the 18th century as part of the Polish-Lithuanian Commonwealth. It is believed the village was founded after neighbouring Novoselivka, when potters' settlements started to expand to the right bank of the Sob River. During Polish times, it was known as Bubnówka or Bubnowce. According to an 1830 statistical document, the village of Bubnówka consisted of 190 houses and 686 inhabitants. As of 1880, it comprised 688 desiatinas of land. It belonged to Countess Aleksandra Potocka at that time, who also owned many other villages and estates within Haisyn County, with the total amounting to 12,129 desiatinas of land. By 1885, Bubnówka had expanded significantly to 271 households, 1,710 inhabitants, an Orthodox school, a school, an inn, 3 water mills, and a distillery.

After the Second Partition of Poland in 1793, the Russian Empire annexed the region and the village, renaming it Russified Bubnivka. During the 1905 Russian Revolution, the village saw unrest break out. The village was then annexed into the Soviet Union following the Russian Civil War. During World War II, the village was occupied starting in 1941. During the war, 168 residents of Bubnivka died fighting with the Soviet Armed Forces, and a further 89 people were taken to work in Nazi Germany, with many never returning. On 13 March 1944, the village was liberated by units of the 42nd Guards Tank Division. During the late Soviet era, it was recorded that there was a state farm in the village with 3,126 hectares of land, which specialised in fattening pigs, an 8-year school, a club, and a library. After the collapse of the Soviet Union, Bubnivka became a part of an independent Ukraine in 1991. In the summer of 2020, as part of administrative reforms, Bubnivka became part of the Haisyn urban hromada and the newly formed Haisyn Raion.

== Bubnivka ceramics ==
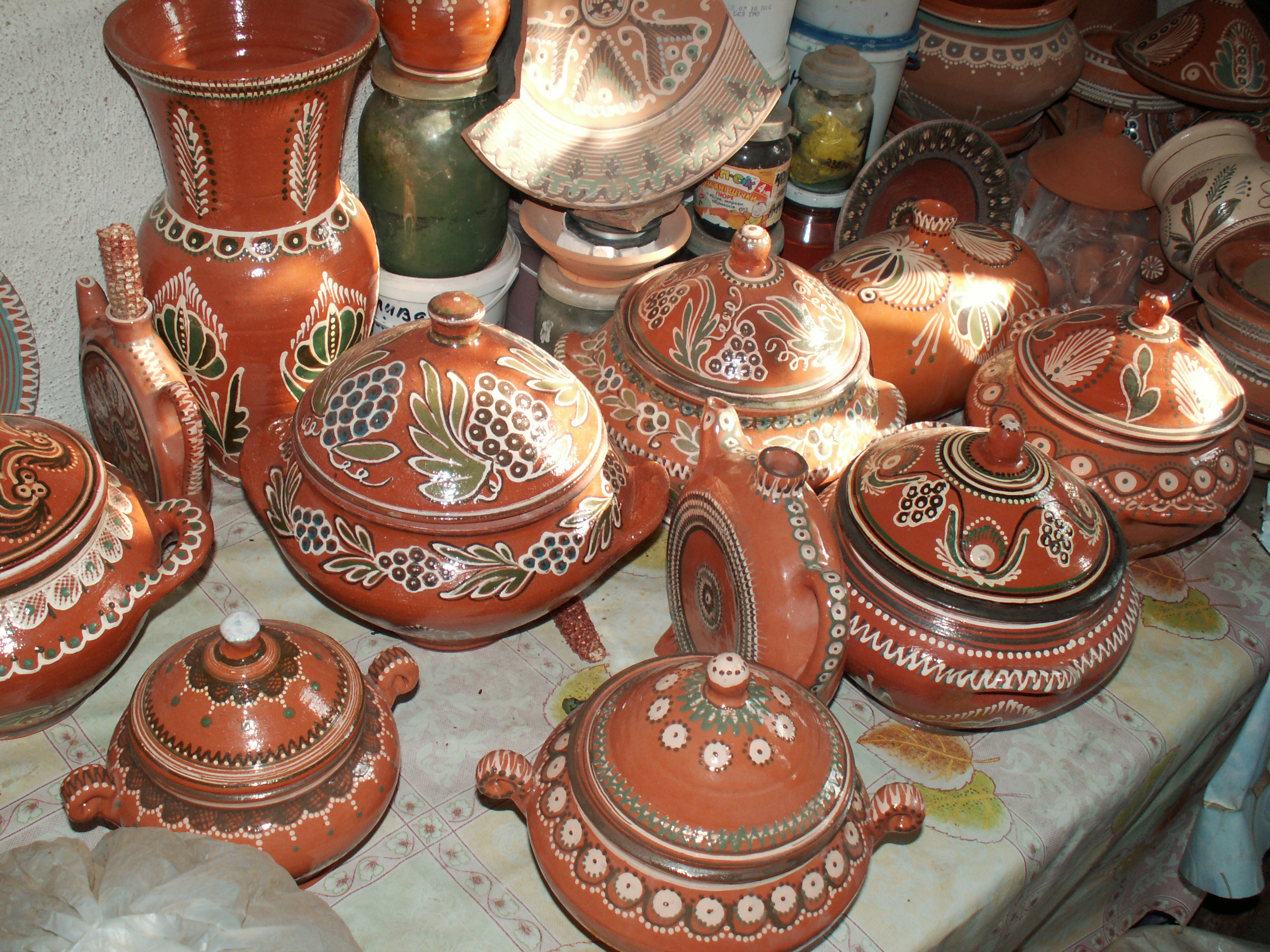
A collection of Bubnivka ceramics.

The tradition of Bubnivka ceramics, a type of ornamental slip-painted pottery, started in the city, hence its name. Most of its early types were unglazed low, spherical pots with a reddish body with stripes, squiggles, and dots. On occasion, large pots were also made. After the introduction of glazing sometime in either the 18th century or early 19th century, the type of pottery began to take form. This second phase of Bubnivka pottery was marked by glaze appearing sometimes, but only in small spots or strokes as a decoration. The third phase came when transparent glaze was used alongside more decorations on the bodies. This became famous through two people: Andrii Honchar, considered the father of the tradition, and then through the Herasymenko brothers. The Herasymenko brothers were eventually invited to Kyiv, where they created their own workshop, which was shown at exhibitions in Kyiv and abroad. Later on in 1969, an experimental pottery workshop and school were opened in Bubnivka, which produced tens of thousands of Bubnivka pottery before being declared unprofitable in 1989. In May 2018, the Ministry of Culture of Ukraine listed Bubnivka ceramics in the National Register of Intangible Cultural Heritage.

== Monuments and Holy Trinity Church ==
The complex-monument to the villagers of Bubnivka who died in World War II.

In 1987, a complex with a monument was built in honour of villagers who died during World War II. The monument consists of seven marble slabs with the names of every villager. To the left is a sculpture of a mother kneeling. In 2017, a new monument was erected to fellow villagers who died in the Anti-Terrorist Operation Zone during the War in the Donbas.

Another local monument is the Holy Trinity Church. It was originally built as a wooden, three-domed church with funds from parishioners and had a wooden bell tower next to it that was consecrated in 1752 and stood until 1890. A new church was eventually proposed under a master craftsman, A. Honchar, and built in an entirely wooden style on the central village hill without a single nail. The iconostasis was specifically brought in from Mount Athos. The new church was consecrated on Trinity Sunday in 1881, with spruce trees and a fenced gate later being added. During the Soviet era, Bolsheviks melted the original bells, and in 1941, during German occupation, valuables were looted from the church. The church was the subject of a local legend during the Soviet era, after a wooden icon of Saint Pantaleon was said to have been used as a butcher's block. When it was used as a butcher's block, it was said that people suffered severe injuries, with the icon itself remaining undamaged, which led to the icon being returned to the church.

== Demographics ==
According to the only official census taken in Ukraine, the 2001 Ukrainian census, the population of Bubnivka was 941 people.

The distribution of the population by mother tongue according to the 2001 census is as follows:

| Language | Percentage |
|---|---|
| Ukrainian | 97.24% |
| Russian | 2.66% |
| Moldovan | 0.11% |

== Transport ==
The P-33 highway passes througgh the village. In 2026, repair work was done on 9.2 kilometres of the P 33 near Haisyn, including in Bubnivka. The village does not have its own railway station. The closest one is the Ladyzhyn station in Ladyzhynske, or the central Haisyn station in Haisyn.
