= Kupil =

Rural locality in Khmelnytskyi Oblast, Ukraine

Coordinates: 49°36′36″N 26°30′36″E

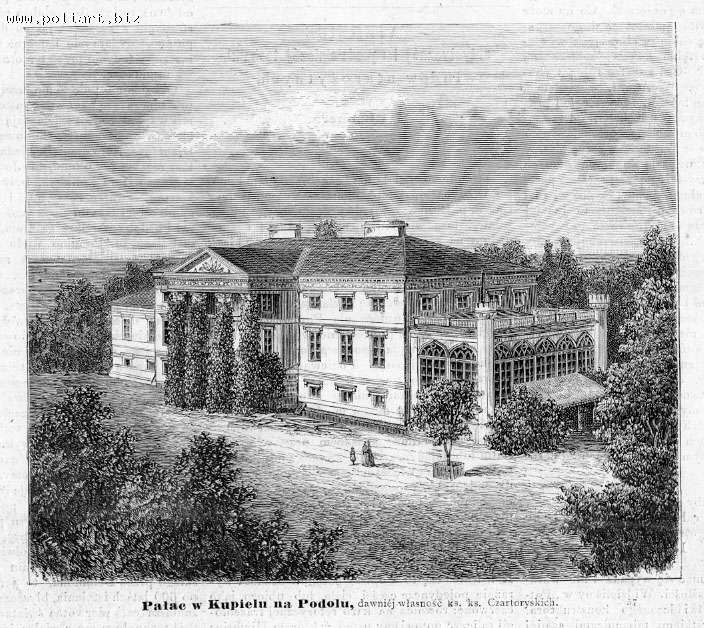

Kupil (Ukrainian: Купіль, pronounced [ˈkupilʲ]; Polish: Kupiel; Russian: Купель, romanized: Kupel', pronounced [ˈkupʲɪlʲ]) is a village (selo) in Khmelnytskyi Raion (district) of Khmelnytskyi Oblast (province) of western Ukraine. It belongs to Viitivtsi settlement hromada, one of the hromadas of Ukraine.

== History ==
Settlement in Kupil began in the 18th century, when it had long been part of the Polish–Lithuanian Commonwealth. The Czartoryski family owned the estate of which Kupiel was a part and they erected a palace by the village. The forced Partitions of Poland at the end of that century incorporated the area into the Russian Empire where it stayed until the Soviet take-over after World War I. The population was made up of Ukrainians, Poles and Jews all of whom had previously been Polish citizens.

During World War II, the invading German army occupied the town on July 5, 1941, following the commencement of Operation Barbarossa. Jewish people were kept imprisoned in a local ghetto and used to perform forced labour. On September 21, 1942, about 600 Jewish inhabitants of Kupil were taken to Volochisk and executed outside the town. The remaining Jewish inhabitants were shot dead at the town's cemetery. Kupil was liberated from German occupation by the Red Army in March 1944.

The Hebrew scholar William Chomsky was born in Kupil in 1896. He later moved to the United States. William is the father of Noam Chomsky and David.

The Yiddish writer Chaim Bejder was born in Kupil in 1920. He was an editor of the only Jewish magazine in the Soviet Union, Sovetish Heymland. He moved to the United States in 1996 and died in the state of New York in 2003.
