= Tomasz Chołodecki =

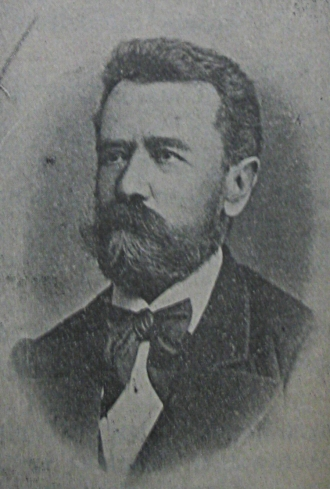
- Coat of arms: Białynia
- Born: 21 December 1813; Bednarów, Galicia
- Died: 17 July 1880 (aged 66); Lwów, Galicia
- Noble family: Chołodecki
- Spouse: Anna Madeyska
- Issue: Tomasz Dominik Jozef Chołodecki; Zofia Chołodecka
- Father: Kajetan Dominik Chołodecki
- Mother: Tekla Mitraszewska

Tomasz Chołodecki (21 December 1813 – 17 July 1880) was a political activist and Polish rebel and soldier, who took part in almost every major event that supported Poland's independence in the 19th century.

== November uprising ==
Tomasz Chołodecki was the son of Kajetan Dominik Chołodecki, the leaseholder of Bednarów in what is now the Kalush Raion in Ukraine. He attended gymnasium nearby in Brzezany and continued his education with jesuit monks in Tarnopol. In 1831 Chołodecki joined General Józef Dwernicki's forces to fight in Poland's November Uprising. He fought in all of the 2nd corps battles, starting with the Battle of Stoczek and ending with the Battle of Boreml. He was injured in that battle and was captured. After he returned to health he was released from prison and returned to Galicia.

== Kraków uprising ==
Upon returning to Galicia, Chołodecki first tried his hand at becoming a mandatariusz. Finding government work unconscionable, he began working in alcohol manufacturing.

During this time he continued to conspire against the Austrian authorities. He was a member of the Centralizacja Towarzyska Demokratyczna, which was run by Robert Chmielewski. His association with this organization was discovered and he was subsequently put under police surveillance.

Still, this did not deter him from conspiring against the state. In 1845 he joined Teofil Wiśniowski and his Towarzystwo Demokratyczne Polskie.

Chołodecki left Zarudz, where the plans for a coming uprising were being laid, on 21 November 1846. He led a platoon of Polish fighters against a group Austrian Hussar's near the Kragla Inn while battling towards Narajów.

When Chołodecki received word that the uprising was being called off in the west, he fled to his cousin who lived in Kudynowce. From Kudynowce he fled to Złoczów with the help of his cousin, in order to obtain a new passport from the Starosta.

He was found and arrested in Złoczów and transported to the criminal court in Lwów. There, the prosecution conducted an investigation from 23 March 1846 until 12 July 1846. After the investigation the court found 25 of the "Narajów expedition" guilty in the first degree, and sentenced to death by hanging.

On 1 July 1847 the high court tribunal in Vienna reduced Chołodecki's sentence to 15 years to be spent in Spielberg. Teofil Wiśniowski and Józef Kapuściński, however, were hanged on 31 July 1847. On 23 March 1848 a general amnesty was given to those who took part in the events of 1846, and Chołodecki left for Lwów.

== January uprising ==
In Lwów Chołodecki was able to get a position as the administrator of the Potocki estate. He later became the administrator in Brzoza Stadnicka. Eventually, he became the director of a sugar plant in Rytwiana.

In 1855 he married Anna Madeyska, and three years later his only son, Tomasz Dominik Jozef Chołodecki, was born. He became involved in the events leading up to the January Uprising of 1863. He joined a local insurgent group and fought in the Battle of Staszów under Marian Langiewicz in February of that year. He was later captured by the Russians, but managed a daring escape.

== Later years ==
Chołodecki made his way back to Lwów after fleeing from Russian captivity, and lived on his retirement income.

In 1878 he took part in actions greeting Otto Hausner in Lwów, which were fought by the Austrian authorities. Chołodecki was wounded an Austrian saber cut to the head. He never fully recovered, and died on 17 July 1880, leaving behind his wife and two children.

== Other notes ==
Tomasz Chołodecki was the great-grandfather of Witold Franciszek Tomasz Chołodecki, who was murdered by Soviet forces in Kharkov in 1940, during what is broadly referred to as the Katyn massacre.

== Sources ==
- Polski slownik biograficzny (Polish Biographical Dictionary), Kraków, 2000
- Boniecki, Adam. Herbarz Polski (Polish Heraldry), Warsaw, 1899–1913
- Chołodecki, Białynia Józef. Białynia-Chołodeccy : uczestnicy spisków, więźniowie stanu (History of the Cholodecki family of the Bialynia Clan). 1911
- Limanowski, Bolesław. Historja ruchu rewolucyjnego w Polsce w 1846 r. 1913
- Żychliński, Tadeusz. Złota Księga Szlachty Polskiej (Golden Tome of Polish Szlachta) Vol. 23, pp. 13–19.
