= Białynia coat of arms =

Polish coat of arms

Białynia
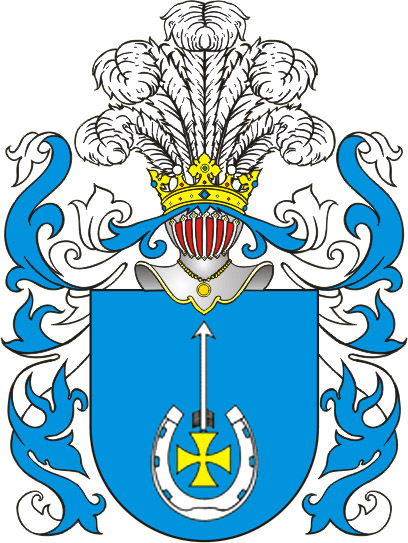
- Battle cry: Białynia
- Alternative name(s): Bielina, Bialina
- Earliest mention: 1332
- Towns: none
- Families: 44 names altogether: Białecki, Białobłocki, Białobocki, Białynicki, Biłuński, Birula, Biwil, Bordziłowski, Ceprzyński, Chołodecki, Ciekawy, Czubik, Dziećmarowski, Dziedziel, Eynarowicz, Ginejko, Golimiński, Harbuz, Jaszczechowski, Kowerski, Kutkiewicz, Ławrynowicz, Ławrynowski, Męczkowski, Mirski, Nowochoński, Odroclew, Pasenko, Poszylski, Rzepecki, Rzepnicki, Rzepniewski, Rzepnik, Sulkowski, Suszko, Światopełk-Mirski Szuszko, Wilczek, Wojcikiewicz, Wójcik, Wóycikiewicz, Wóycikowski, Zabłocki, Zdanowicz, Zyżniewski, Żyźniewski, Żyżniewski

Białynia is a Polish coat of arms. It was used by several szlachta families in the times of the Kingdom of Poland and the Polish–Lithuanian Commonwealth.

== History ==
This coat of arms was acquired in Poland in 1332 during the last year of the reign of Władyslaw Łokietek (Władysław I the Elbow-high). The king led an expedition against the Knights of the Teutonic Order (Teutonic Knights). When the army reached the enemy's camp, a knight of the house Jastrzębiec concealed flaming arrows from the night watch and torched the enemy's tents. The fire enabled the king's army to rout and kill the enemy with dispatch. The knight's ingenuity was rewarded with the addition of an arrow to the family's coat of arms which was then named for the village, Białynia, near which the action took place. The talked of expedition likely took place during the famous Battle of Płowce which occurred on 27 September 1331.

== Blazon ==
A white horseshoe with its ends pointing upwards with a cross in the middle on a shield, above the cross an arrow flying upwards upon a blue background. Five ostrich feathers on the knight's helmet.

== Variations ==
A number of variations of the Bialynia coat of arms appeared for different families.

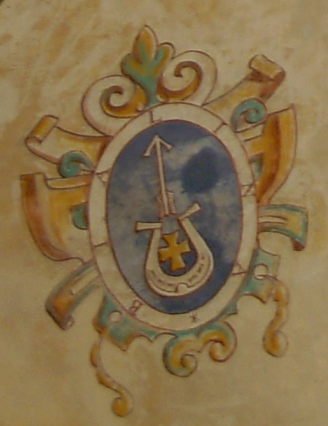
Bialynia coat of arms in Baranow-Sandomierski castle

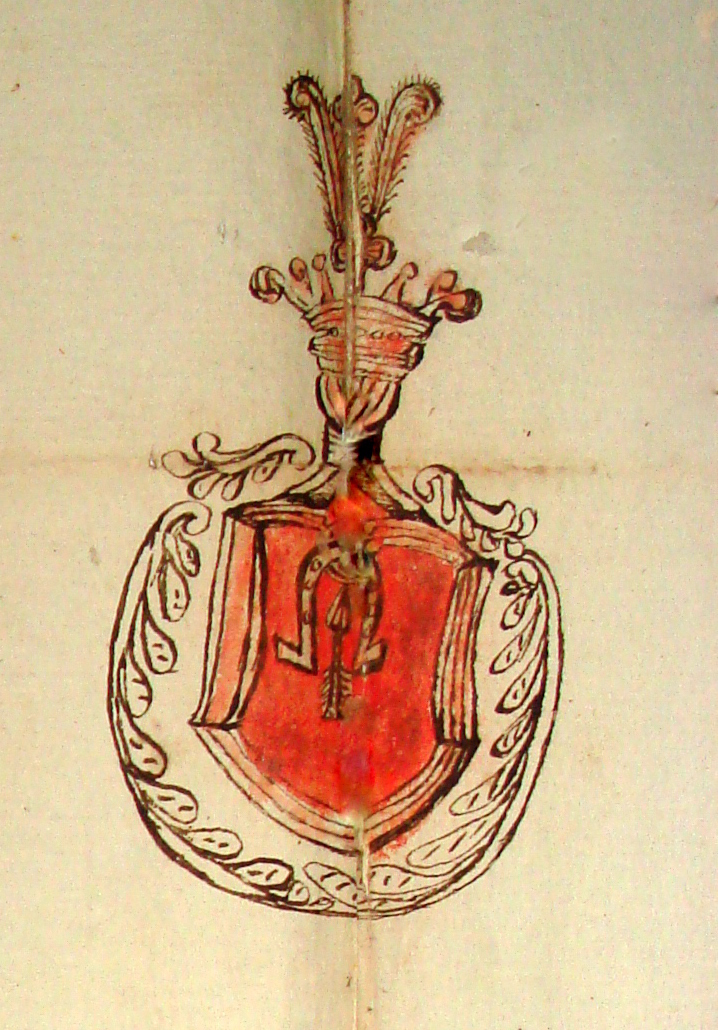
Chołodecki

Mirski

Białobłocki

Białobłocki (odm)

Ejnarowicz

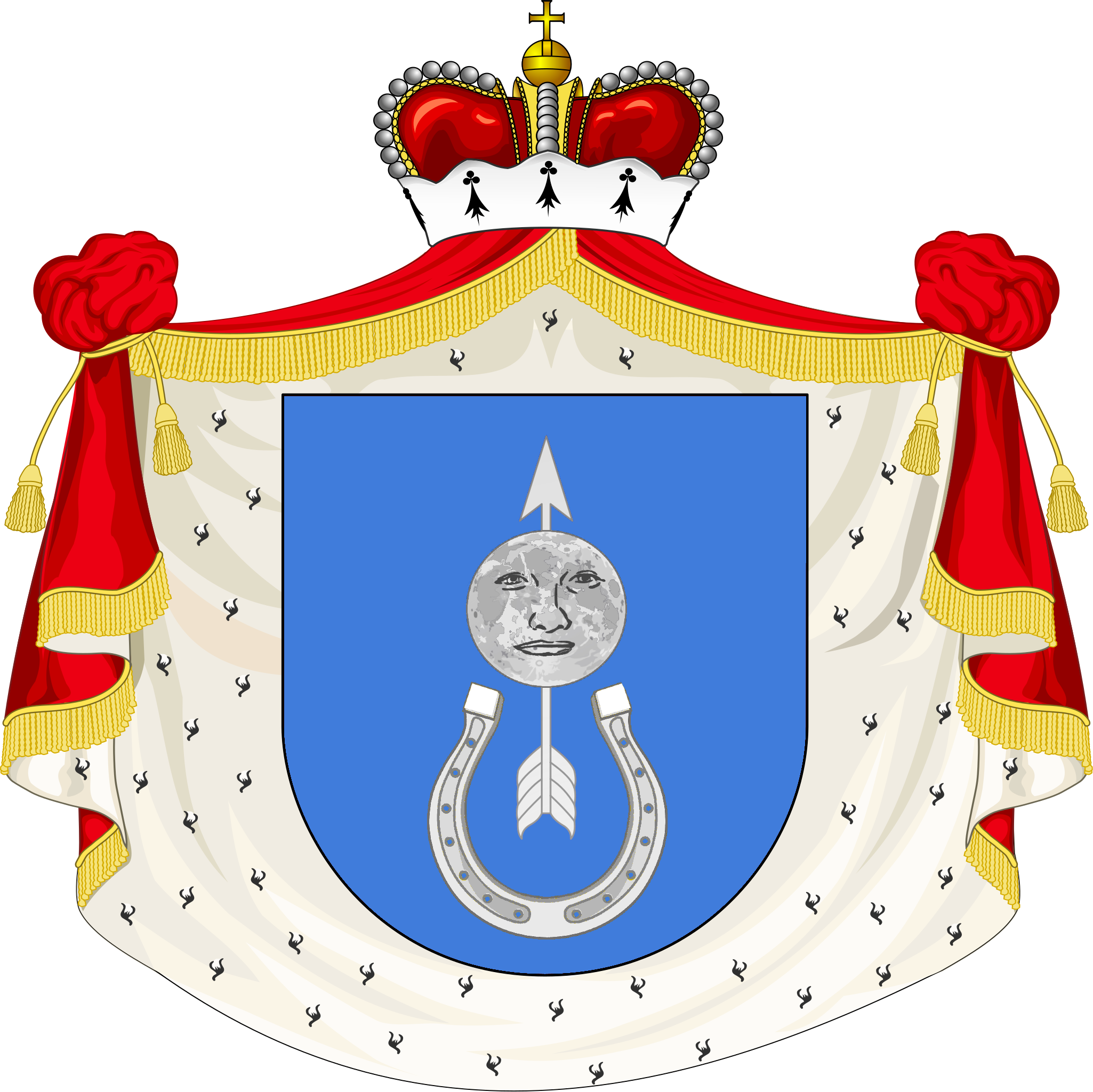
Światopełk-Mirski

== Notable bearers ==
Notable bearers of this coat of arms include:

- Józef Białynia Chołodecki
- Mikołaj Światopełk-Mirski

== See also ==
- Polish heraldry
- Heraldic family
- List of Polish nobility coats of arms
