= Dov-Ber =

Dov Ber, Dov-Ber or Dovber (Hebrew: דובער) is a bilingual Hebrew-Yiddish tautological name: דוב־בער dov-ber, literally 'bear-bear', traceable back to the Hebrew word דוב \ דֹּב \ דב dov 'bear' and the Middle High German word bër 'bear'. In various countries the spelling may vary: Dow Bär, Dow Ber, Duber, etc. Notable people with the name include:

- Dov Ber Abramowitz, an American Orthodox rabbi and author
- Dov Ber Birkenthal
- Dov Ber Borochov
- Dov-Ber, Hebrew name of Boris Gersman (1900–1953), South African musician and businessman
- Dow Ber Meisels (1798-1870), Polish rabbi
- Dov Ber of Mezeritch, a disciple of Hasidic founder Rabbi Yisrael Baal Shem Tov
- Dov Ber Nathanson
- Dov-Ber Rosofsky (Barney Ross) (1909-1967), American world champion Hall of Fame lightweight and junior welterweight boxer
- Dovber Schneuri, also known as the Mitteler Rebbe ("Middle Rebbe" in Yiddish)
- Abraham Dov Ber Gottlober
- Avraham Dov Ber Kahana
- Avraham Dov Ber Lebensohn
- Chaim Avraham Dov Ber Levine
- Issachar Dov-Ber Bampi, Russian Jewish scholar
- Sholom Dovber Schneersohn
- Yissachar Dov Ber Horowitz
- Yitzchak Dovber Schneersohn
- Yoel Dov-Ber Perski

== See also ==
- Dov
- Ber (name)
