= Persky =

Persky is an Ashkenazi Jewish toponymic surname after the village of Pershai in today's Valozhyn Raion, Belarus. Variants include Perski and Perske.

Notable persons with the surname Persky include:

- Aaron Persky (born 1962), American judge
- Bill Persky (born 1931), American director
- Lester Persky (1925-2001), American producer
- Lisa Jane Persky (born 1955), American actor
- Stan Persky (born 1941), Canadian author

== See also ==
- Parsky, a surname
