= Perski =

Perski is an Ashkenazi Jewish toponymic surname after the village of Pershai in today's Valozhyn Raion, Belarus. Variants include Persky and Perske.

Notable persons with the surname Perski include:

- Peter Perski (born 1970), Swedish actor
- Szymon Perski (born 1923), birth name of Shimon Peres, Israeli statesman
- Yoel Dov-Ber Perski (1816–1871), writer and translator

== See also ==
- Constantin Perskyi (1854–1906), Russian scientist and professor
