= Bernhard Nathanson =

- Dov Ber Natanzohn
- Born: 22 April 1832; Satanov, Podolian Governorate, Russian Empire
- Died: 2 February 1916 (aged 83); Warsaw, Congress Poland
- Occupations: Journalist and writer
- Writing career
- Language: Hebrew and Yiddish

Bernhard Nathanson (22 April 1832 – 2 February 1916), born David Ber Nathanson or Dov Ber Nathanson (Hebrew: דֹּב-בֶּר בֵּן יְהוּדָה נָתָנְזוֹן, Yiddish: דב בער נאטאנזאהן), was a Jewish Russian Hebrew journalist and author. He was the biographer and publisher of the writings of Isaac Baer Levinsohn.

== Biography ==
Bernhard Nathanson was born to a wealthy Jewish family in Satanov, Podolia. He his early Hebrew education under Yosef Tzvi Polichinetzki and then under the supervision of his own father, and received rabbinical ordination in 1850. Under the influence of the Haskalah, Nathanson went to Odessa after his father's death in 1853, where he devoted himself to both Jewish and secular studies. There he co-operated with Jacob Israel Levinsohn, the nephew of Isaac Baer Levinsohn, in copying and revising the latter's manuscripts. Nathanson was occupied for three years on Levinsohn's Aḥiyah ha-Shiloni ha-Ḥozeh and Zrubavel.

From 1871 to 1875 Nathanson lived in various places in Bessarabia, settling in Warsaw in 1875 in connection with the publication of the complete works of Levinsohn. He died there in February 1916 at the age of 83.

== Publications ==
Nathanson's first article, "Le-Torah veli-Te'udah" ('Torah and Testimony'), was published in Ha-Maggid in 1864. He later serves as the Odessa, Kishinev, and Warsaw correspondent for Ha-Melitz in St. Petersburg, to which he also contributed stories and impressions of Jewish life. The more important among his articles, contributed chiefly to Ha-Melitz, are: "Tekunat Sefat 'Ivrit ve-Hargashoteha" (1868); "Kerobaz (1869); "'Al ha-Tzaddikim ve-'al ha-Ḥasidim" (1869); "Lefanim veha-Yom" (1870); "Zikronot le-Korot Odessa" (1870).

Nathanson wrote also: Ma'areket Sifre Kodesh, Biblical onomasticon (Odessa, 1871); Sefer ha-Zikhronot, biography of Isaac Baer Levinsohn (Warsaw, 1875); Sefer ha-Milim Zarim-Melakhutiyim, lexicon of foreign words and technical terms found in the Talmud and midrashic literature (Warsaw, 1880).
