= Great Synagogue (Sataniv) =

Synagogue in Sataniv, Ukraine

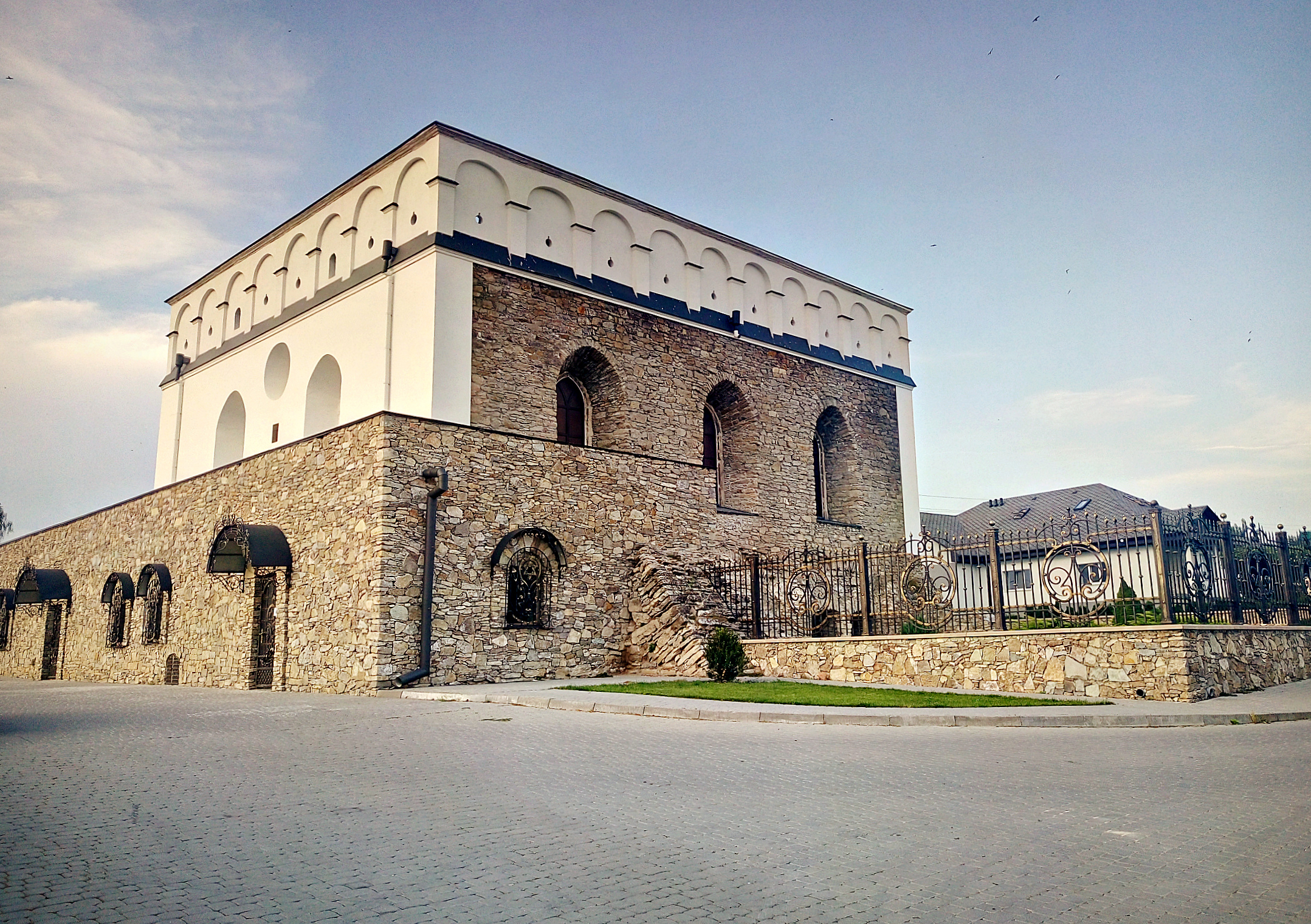
- The synagogue after restoration, 2021

- Location of the synagogue in Ukraine

Religion
- Affiliation: Judaism
- Ecclesiastical or organizational status: Synagogue (16th–20th centuries); Warehouse (1933–??); Synagogue (since 2012)
- Status: Active

Location
- Location: Synahoha, Sataniv, Khmelnytskyi Oblast 32034
- Country: Ukraine
- Interactive map of Great Synagogue
- Coordinates: 49°15′09″N 26°14′50″E

Architecture
- Type: Synagogue architecture
- Style: Fortress synagogue; Polish Renaissance
- Completed: 1500s
- Materials: Stone

Immovable Monument of National Significance of Ukraine
- Official name: Синагога (Synagogue)
- Type: Architecture
- Reference no.: 220037

The Great Synagogue is a Jewish synagogue, located on Synahoha, in Sataniv, a town in the Khmelnytskyi Oblast of Ukraine. Built in the 1500s in what was then the Kingdom of Poland, it is one of the oldest synagogues in Ukraine.

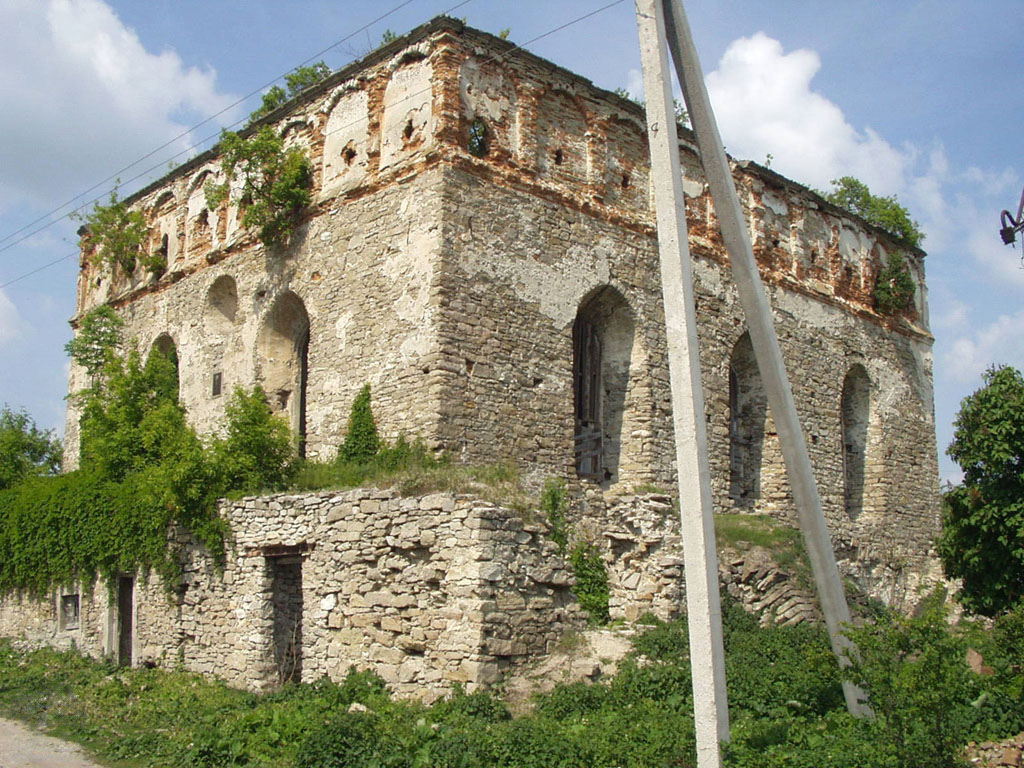
The synagogue before renovation, 2010

== History ==
Most sources state 1514 or 1532 as the year of construction. However, structural and stylistic features of the building, as well as a comparison with the nearby monastery, support the evidence that the synagogue was built at the beginning of the 17th century. This is further supported by chemical analysis of the mortar in 1992, which showed that it is similar to the mortars of the mid-17th and early 18th century.

In 1933 the synagogue was confiscated by the Soviet authorities and converted into a warehouse. In later years it stood empty and derelict. Restoration work began in 2012, which has now been completed.

== Architecture ==
The synagogue, which had walls up to 2 metres (6 ft 7 in) thick, was a fortress synagogue. It was built in the style of the Polish Renaissance. The main hall had rib vaults and was the men's prayer hall. Annexes to the west and south served as prayer-rooms for the women. Worth mentioning are the lithic Holy Ark with fine ornaments as well as the main entrance, which is surmounted by a plaster frame. Inside the frame, there is a heraldic composition.

After falling into disrepairs, it was reported that Boris Slobodnyuk, a Ukrainian Christian, was funding work to restore the synagogue.

== See also ==
- History of the Jews in Ukraine
- List of synagogues in Ukraine
