= Sataniv Castle =

- Сатанівський замок
- Sataniv, Khmelnytskyi Oblast, Ukraine
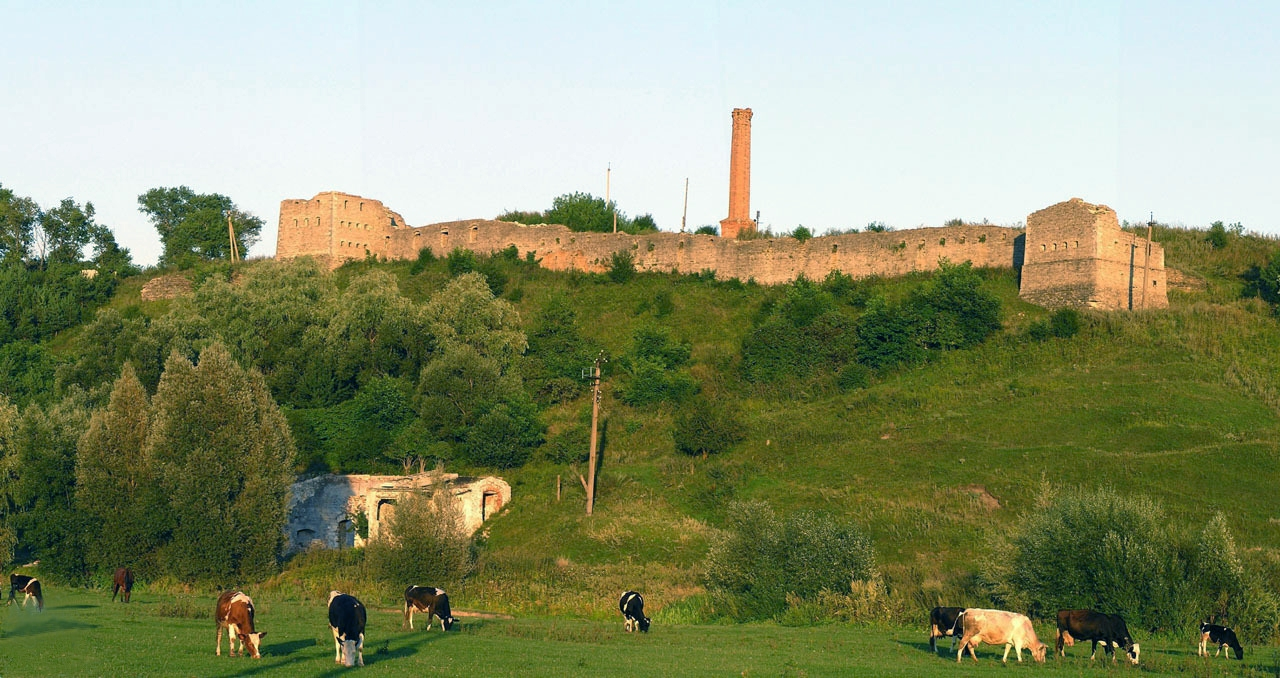
- The castle in 2012

Site information
- Type: Fortress

Location
- Coordinates: 49°15′26.75″N 26°15′09.05″E

Site history
- Built: 15th–16th centuries
- Materials: Stone

Immovable Monument of National Significance of Ukraine
- Official name: Замок (Castle)
- Type: Architecture
- Reference no.: 220036

Sataniv Castle (Ukrainian: Сатанівський замок) is a fortress in the rural settlement of Sataniv, Khmelnytskyi Raion, Khmelnytskyi Oblast, Ukraine. It is an architectural monument of national significance.

== Location ==
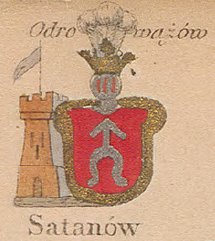
Sataniv Castle on an 1868 map by Zygmunt Gerstmann

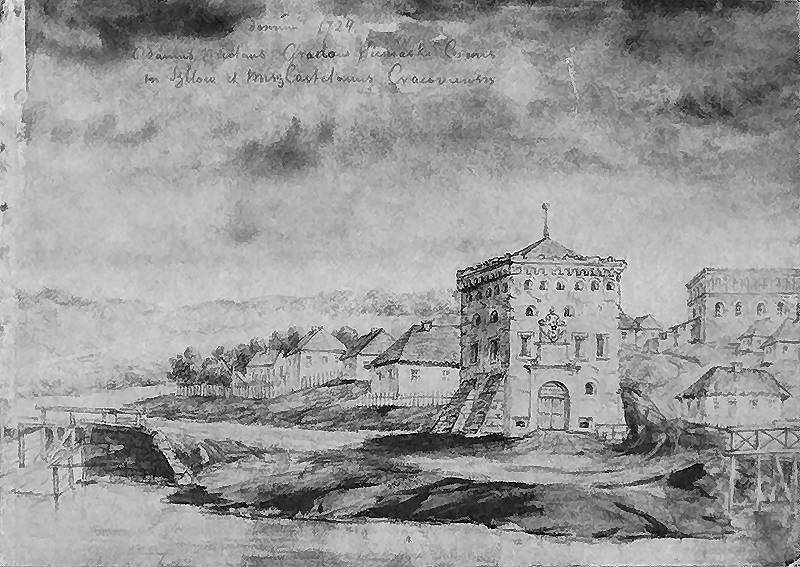
City gate in 1871 by Napoleon Orda

Sataniv Castle is located in the northern part of Sataniv, on a high hill near the Zbruch River. According to the plan, it is pentagonal, but irregular in shape: three sides are approximately 105 m long, the fourth is 85 m, and the fifth (southern) is 65 m. The entire area of the castle occupied approximately 1.5 ha. There were towers at all corners of the pentagon, and there were walls between the towers. Today, the eastern tower and the remains of two towers located directly above Zbruch have been preserved. The two towers on the side of the town have been destroyed.

== Description ==
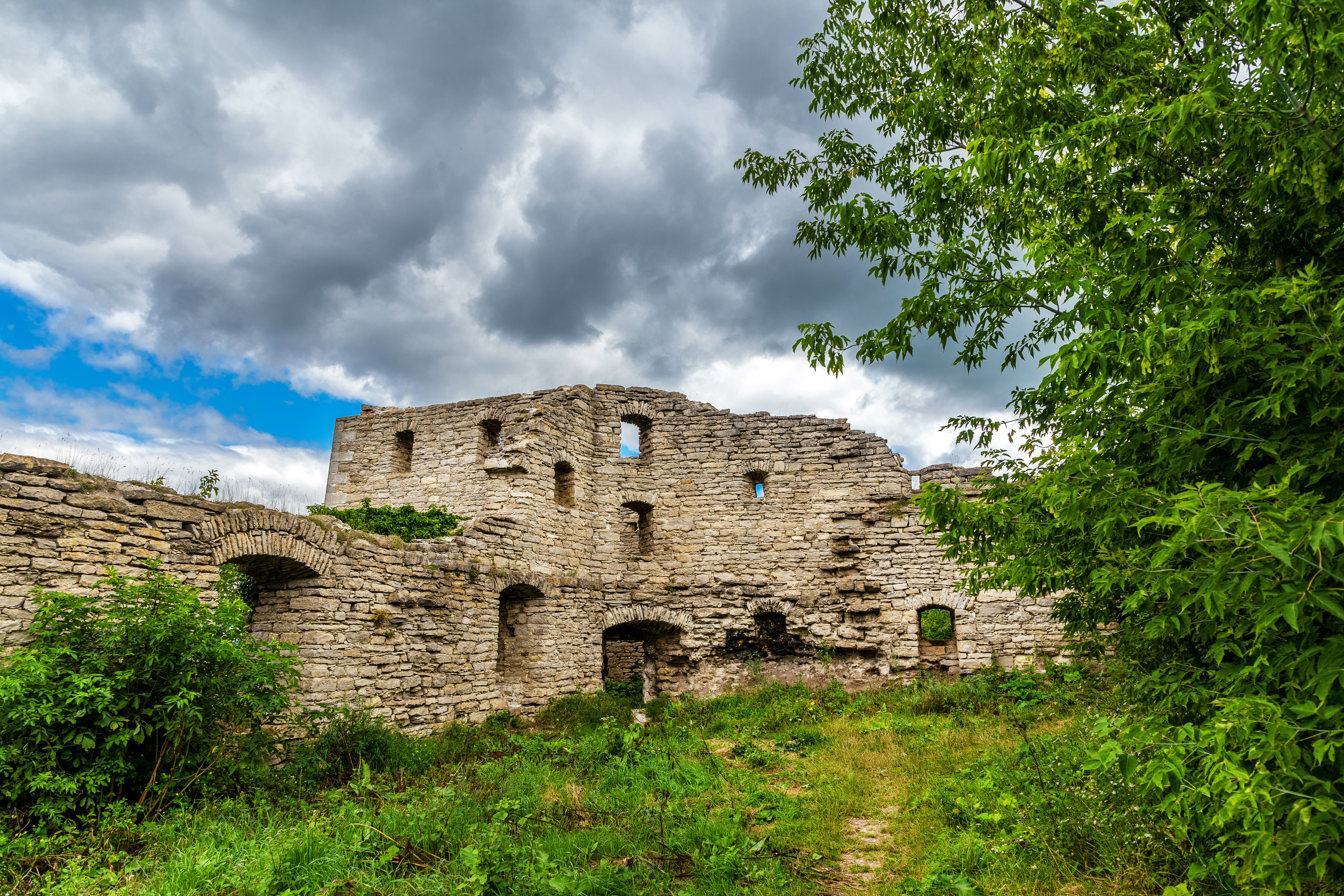
Tower ruins

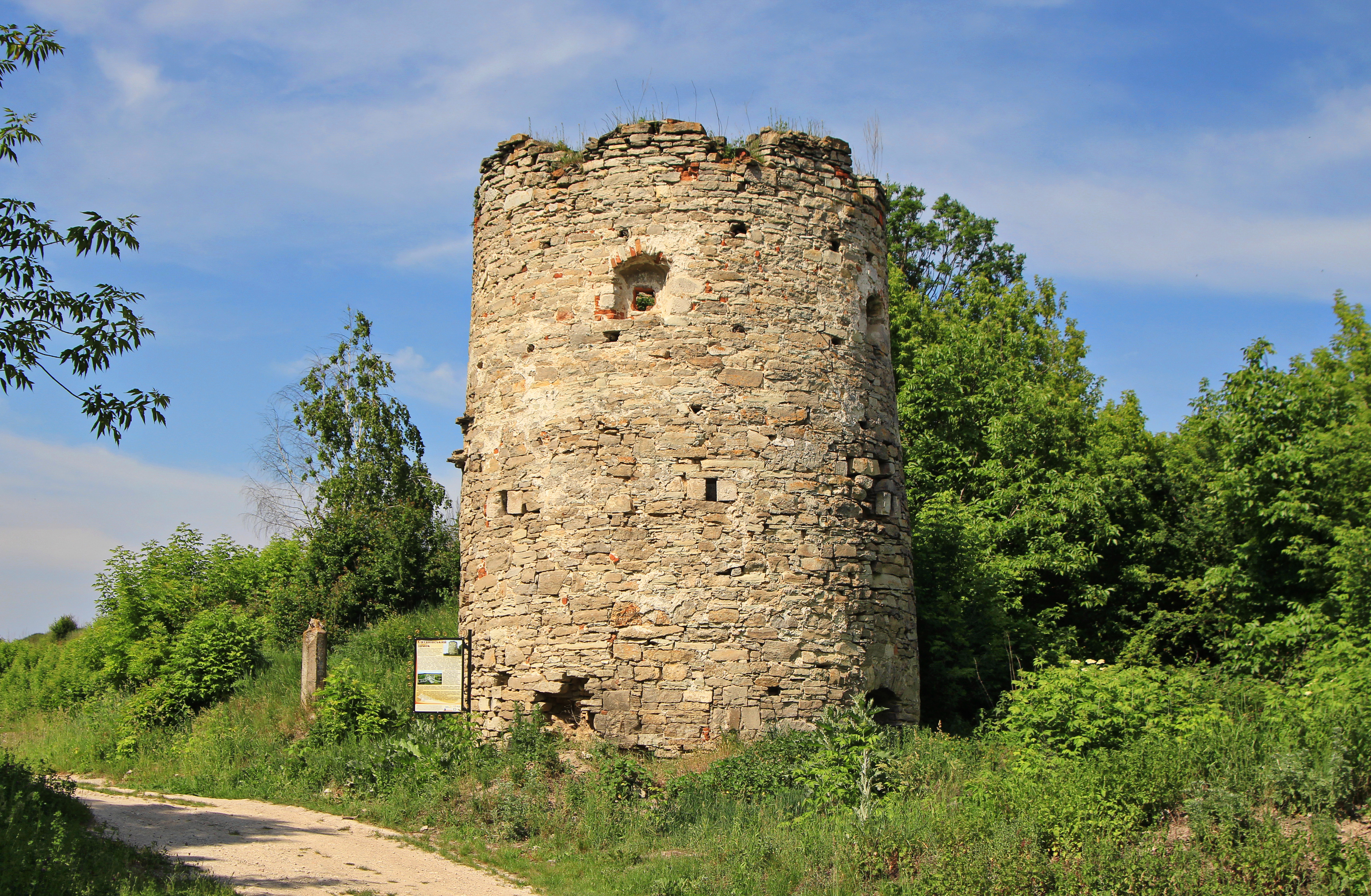
Entrance tower

The walls connecting the towers were double: in addition to the outer ones, there were inner ones that ran parallel to the former. The inner walls stood on a rampart, so they were higher than the outer ones. The ramparts on which the inner walls stood were separated from the outer ones by a moat. There were also moats outside (behind the walls). The inner walls have not survived; only in some places their traces are visible on the ramparts. From the side of the castle overlooking Zbruch, the walls were single, because here, thanks to the steep mountain, the approach to the castle was protected by nature itself. In some places, the height of the walls reached 10.5 m.

The towers standing outside at the corners of the castle were quadrangular and extended far beyond the line of the walls, and only one of their corners was attached to the corner of the castle. The width of the faces of the towers was about 8.5 m. The towers are three-story; the lower floor is much wider than the other two. The lower floor has occasional embrasures (4 on average on each outer side), and on the third floor there were two small windows on each side.

In the castle, the blocks are so regular in shape and uniform in size that from a distance they resemble brickwork.

In the southeastern corner of the castle, on the line of the inner walls, a round tower has been preserved, built long before the known documentary mentions of the settlement. This tower is a unique architectural monument, a rather rare example of masonry construction from the times of Kievan Rus'. Its loopholes are very narrow on the outside, and expand on the inside to make it more convenient to shoot from a bow.

According to legend, in the village of Kalaharivka, Ternopil Oblast, located on the right bank of the Zbruch River, there is a cellar from which an underground passage begins, leading to the left bank of the Zbruch River — to the Sataniv Fortress.

== History ==
The exact date of the construction of the castle in Sataniv is unknown. In 2004, historian Mykola Petrov cautiously noted: "It is possible that the castle was built in Sataniv sometime in the second half of the 15th to early 16th centuries". The architect-restorer Yevhenia Plamenytska, in 1986, categorically stated: "The castle was built in the 15th century on the site of earlier fortifications of the 14th century. At the end of the 16th century, the castle was expanded, it acquired a pentagonal shape in plan with corner pentagonal towers".

Despite the presence of a castle, the city was repeatedly destroyed by the Tatars (in 1528, 1530, 1617), captured by the Cossacks and Opryshky in the mid-17th century, and captured by the Turks in 1676.

In 1711, the Moscow Tsar Peter I, on his way to Karlsbad (now Karlovy Vary) for a spa treatment after his unsuccessful Prut campaign, passed through Sataniv and stayed at Sataniv Castle with its owner, the Grand Crown Hetman Adam Sieniawski. There is a surviving record that the Tsar lived in a small house near the castle. In that house, the Russian coat of arms was carved on the stone to commemorate the Tsar's stay there.

On 24 August 1711, the Danish envoy to Peter I, Just Juel, visited Sataniv. He noted in his diary: "This is a well-equipped city. It is fortified with ancient walls and towers".

In 1899, a sugar refinery was built near the ruins of the castle on the side of the town, and a water pipeline was placed in the castle itself, which drew water from Zbruch and fed it upstairs to the factory. In 1924, the local authorities decided to demolish the Sataniv Castle because it allegedly threatened human life, but the All-Ukrainian Central Executive Committee canceled that resolution and ordered the fortress to be restored, for which it allocated 5 thousand rubles. However, the restoration was not carried out.

On 24 August 1963, by a resolution of the Council of Ministers of the Ukrainian SSR, Sataniv Castle, as well as two other defensive structures of the town—the city gate and the synagogue—were included in the list of architectural monuments of the Ukrainian SSR under state protection.

On 23 June 1989, the coat of arms of Sataniv was approved, one of the elements of which is a golden fortress wall with towers (designed by Borys Shulevsky).

== In art ==
On 1 July 1921, in Ternopil, Ukrainian writer Klym Polishchuk wrote the short story "Treasures of the Ages", which takes place in Sataniv and tells about the mythical treasures of Sataniv Castle. The writer included this story in his collection of Ukrainian legends "Treasures of the Ages", which was published in 1921 by the Rusalka publishing house. On 6 July 1922, the story was published in the newspaper Svoboda in the United States.

== Gallery ==
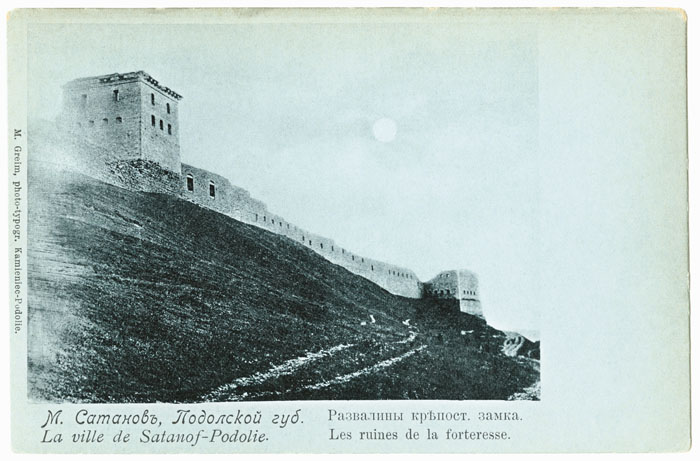
The castle in early 20th century

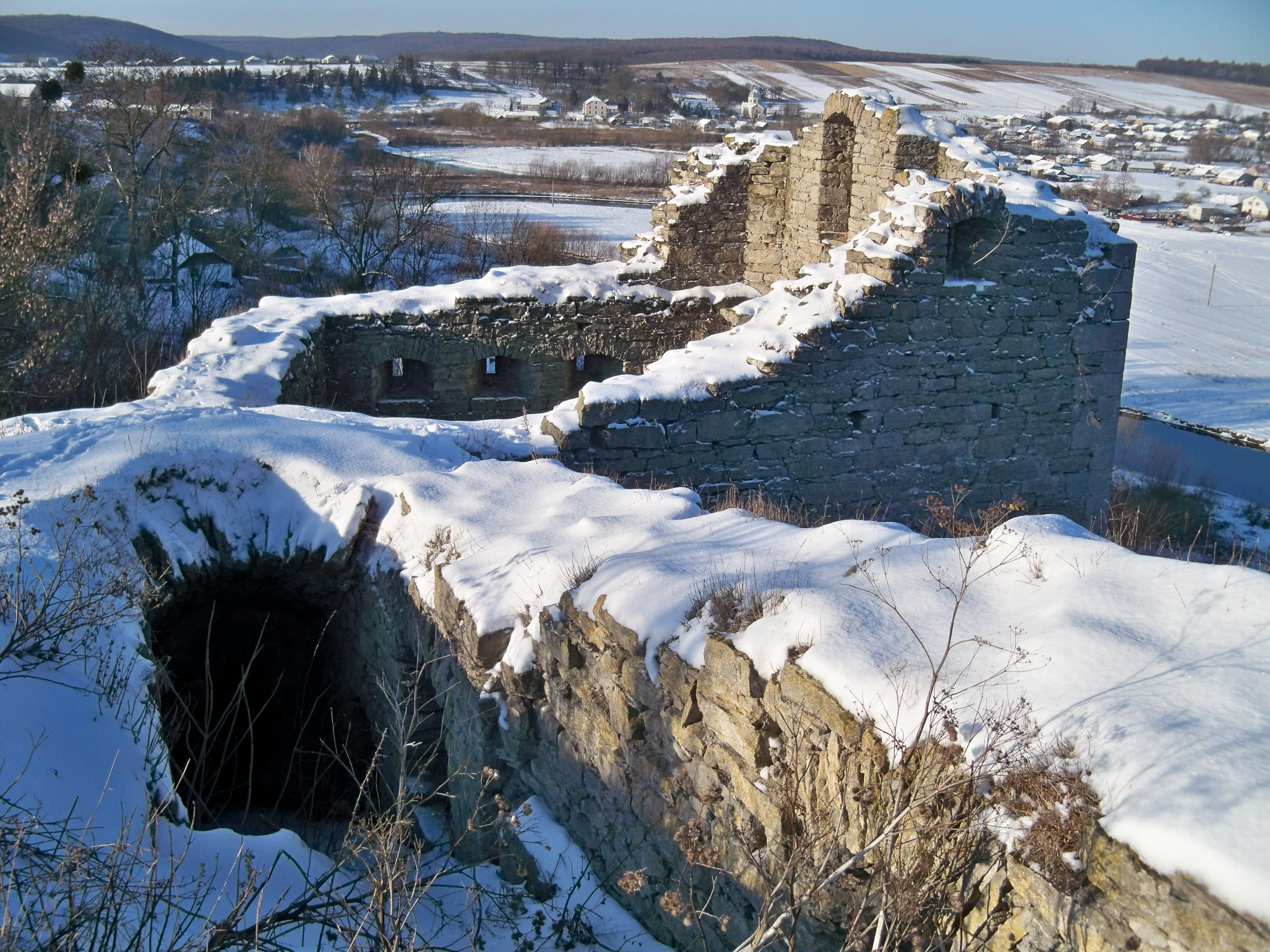

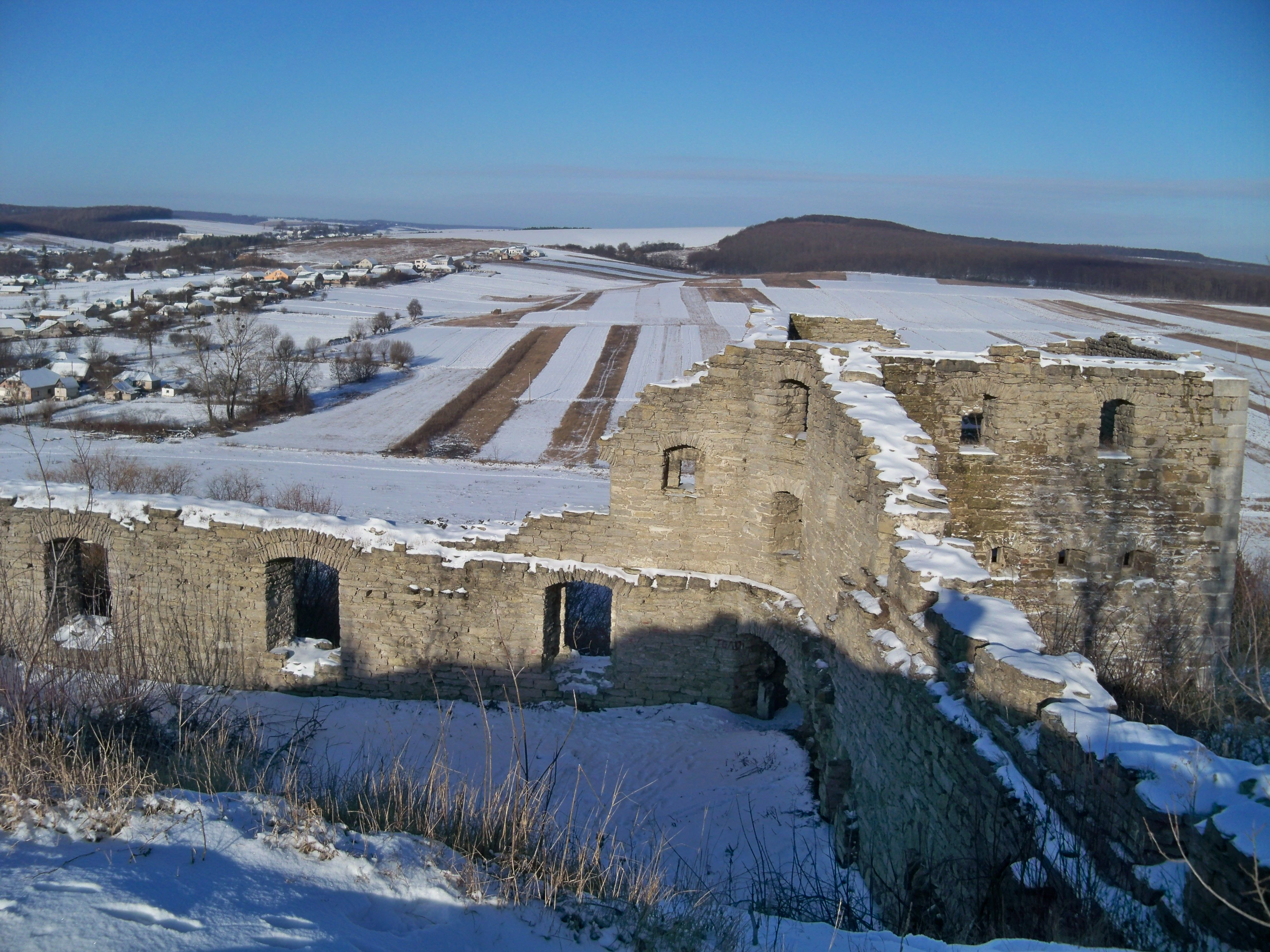

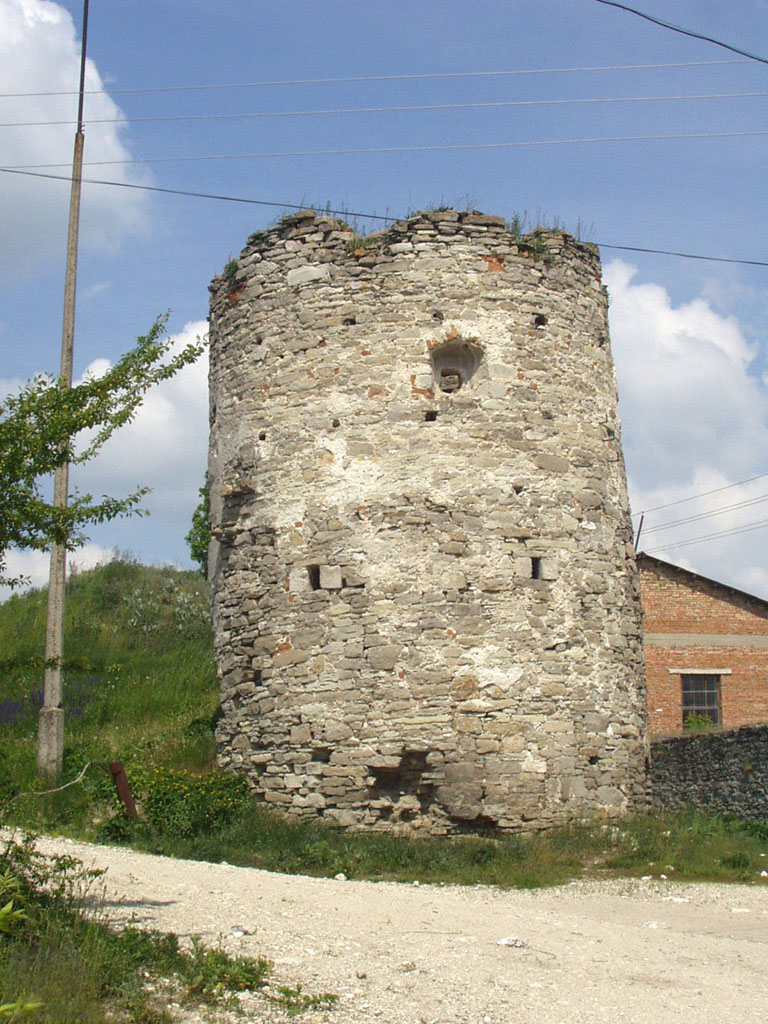

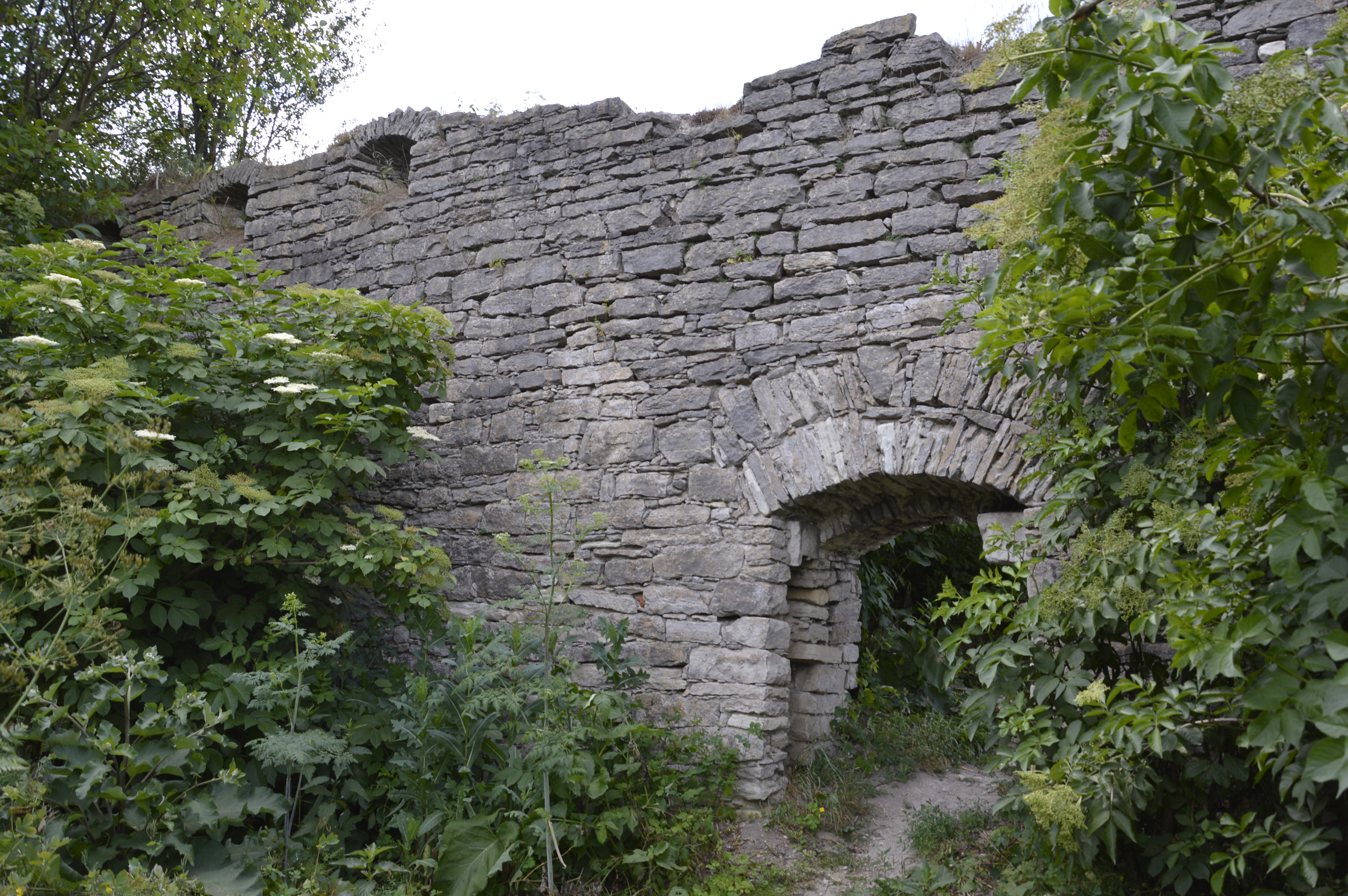

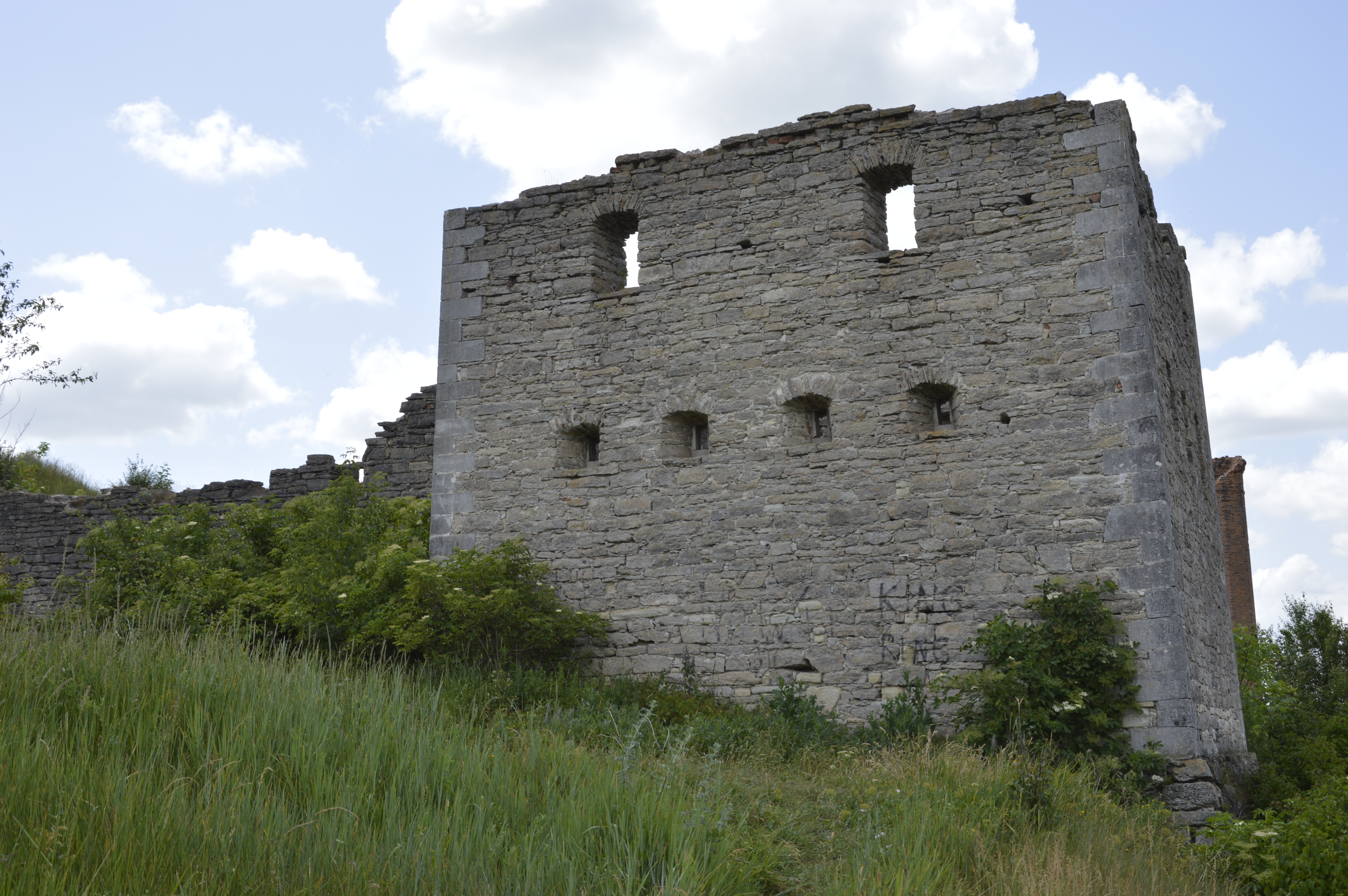

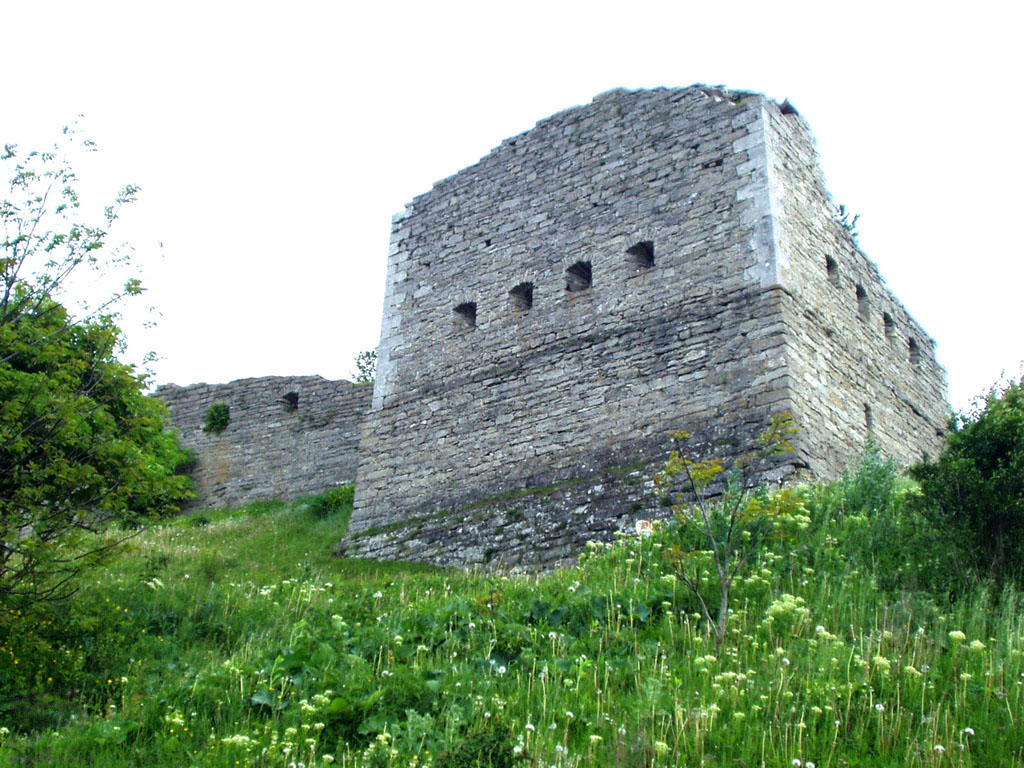

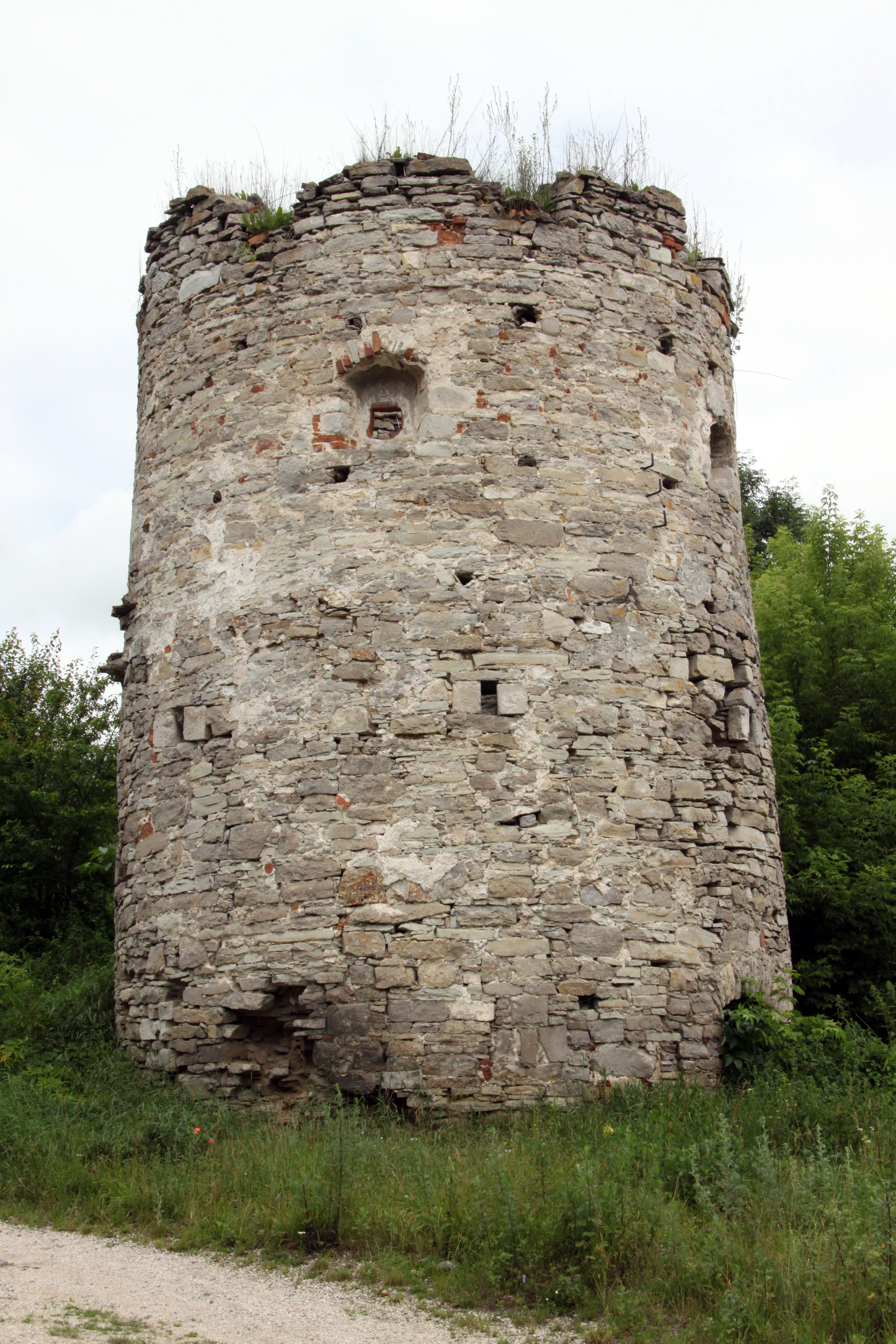

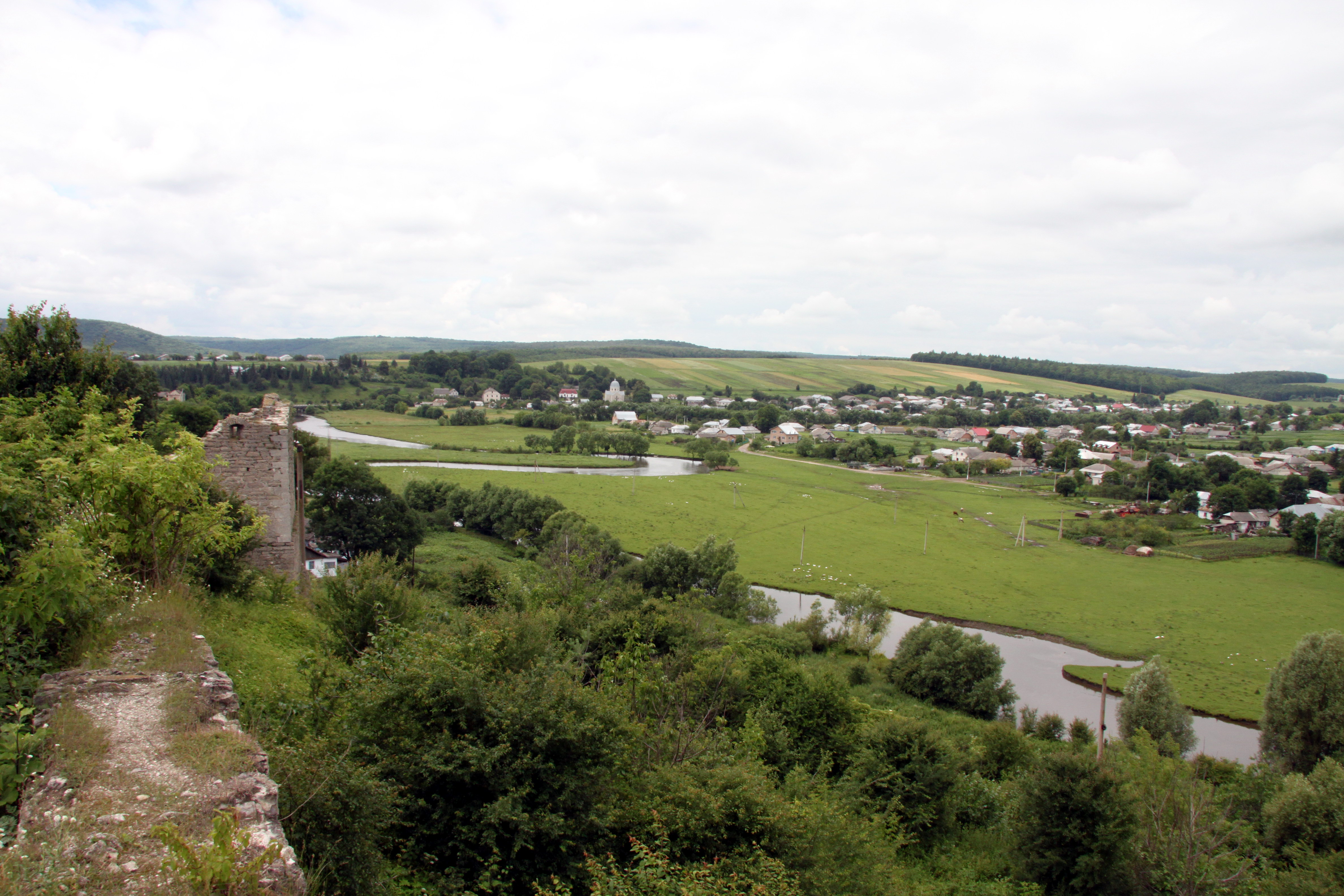

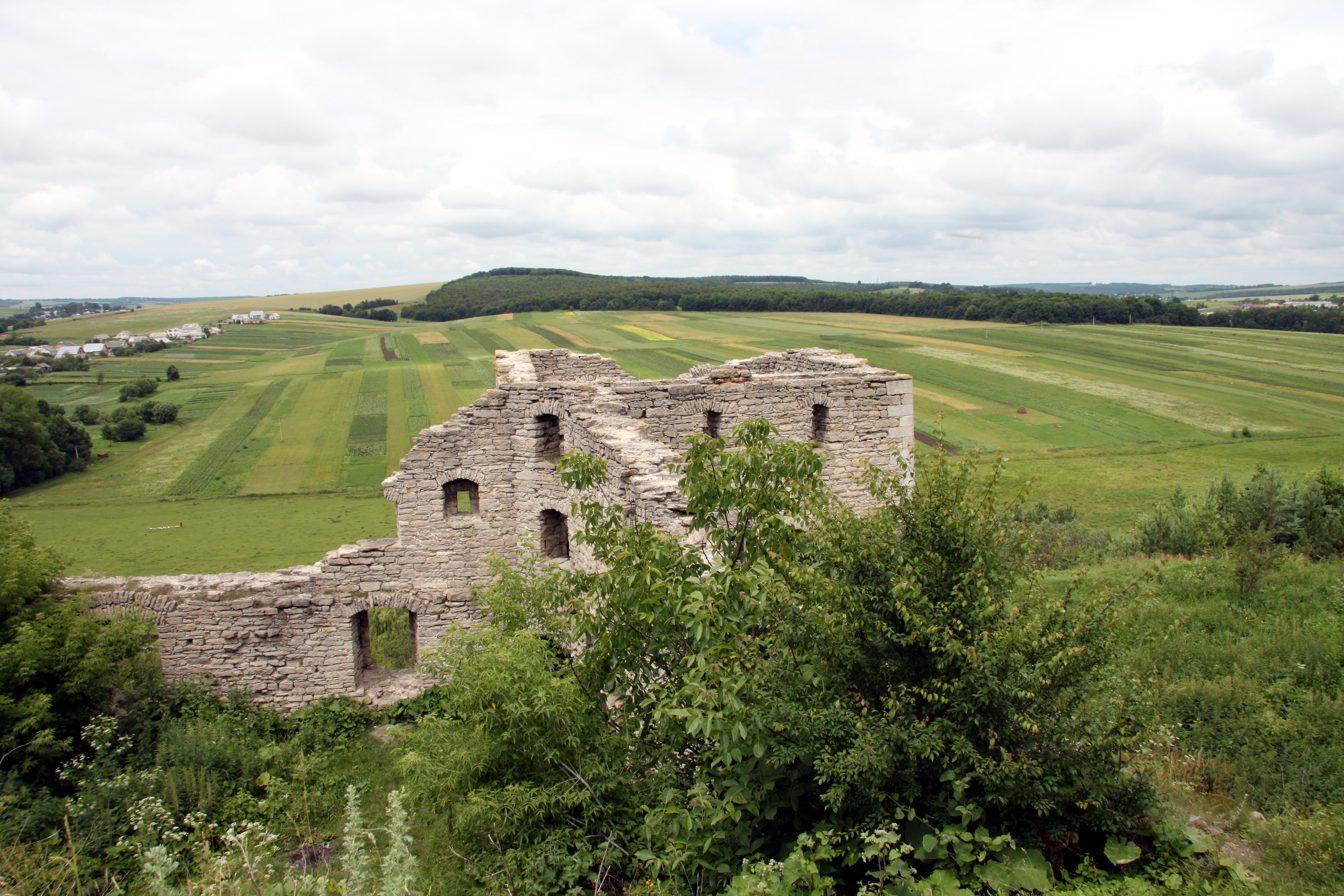

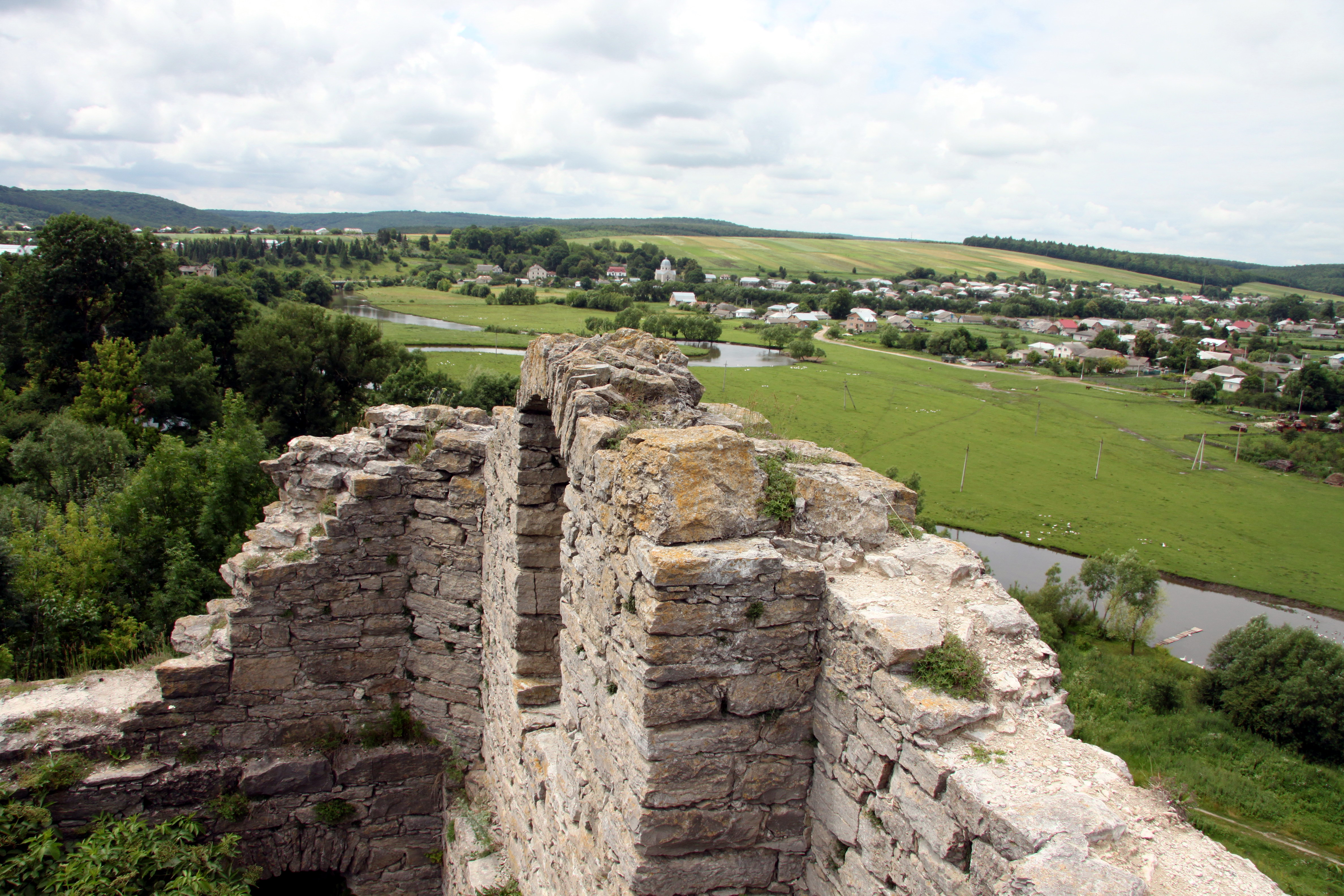

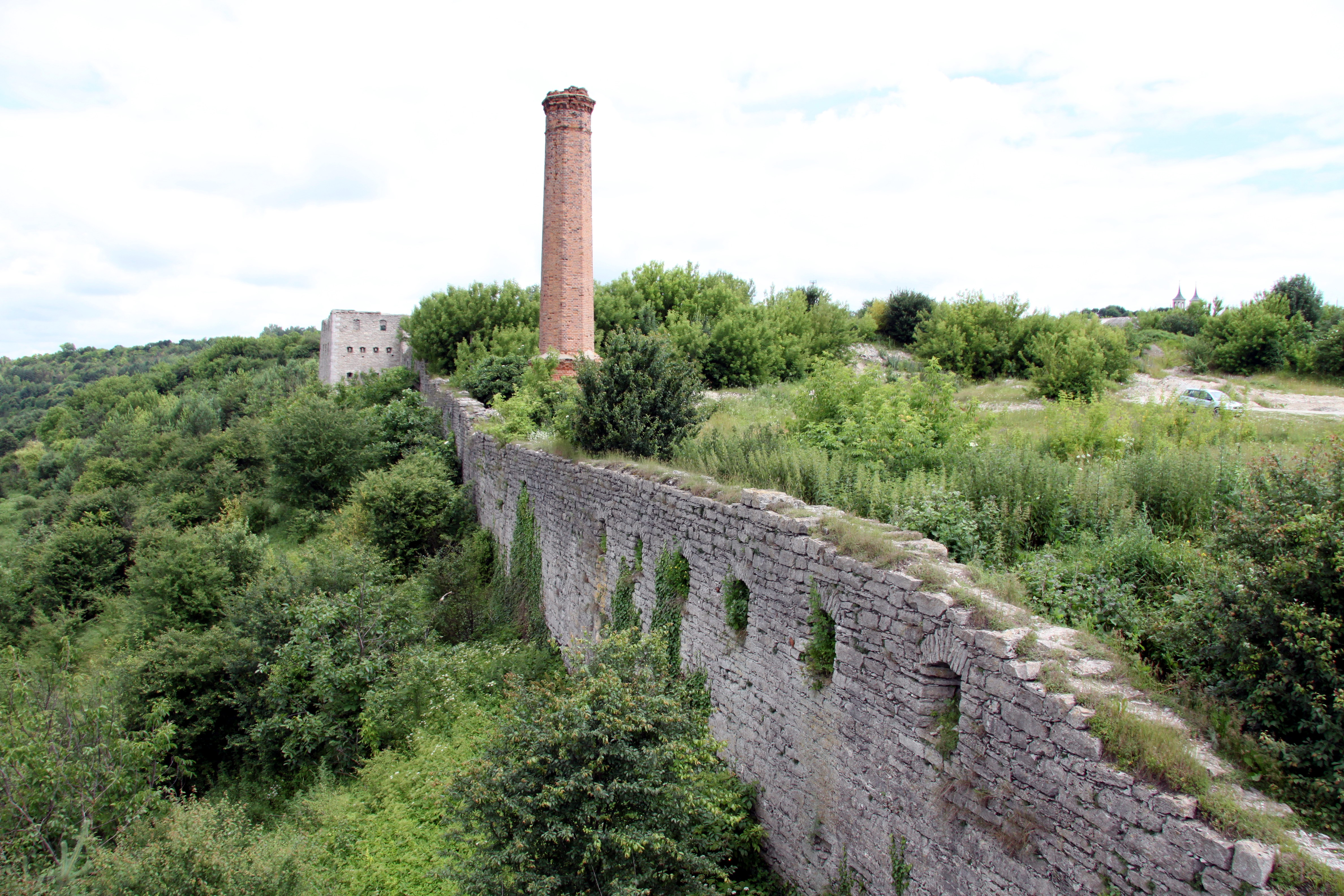

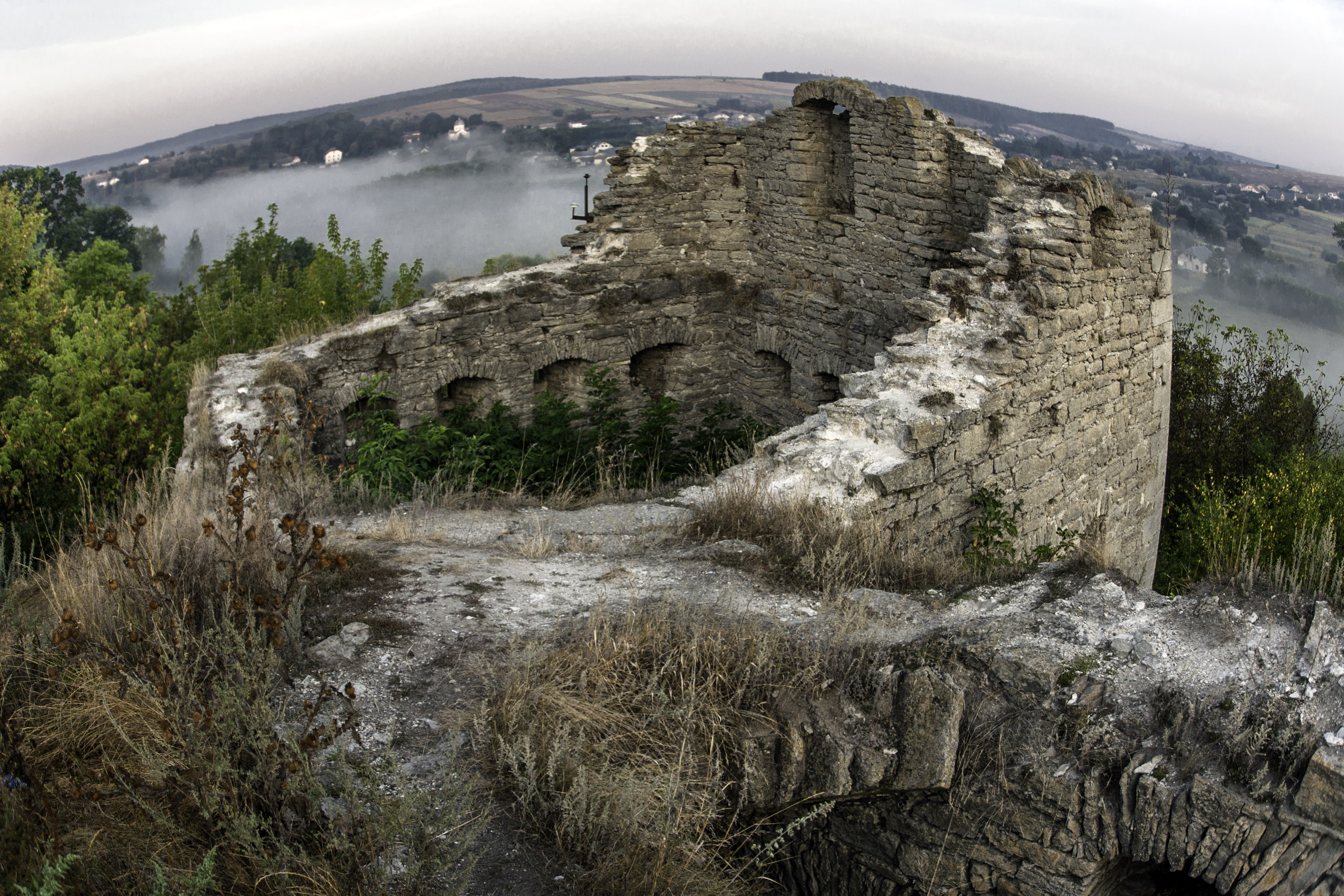

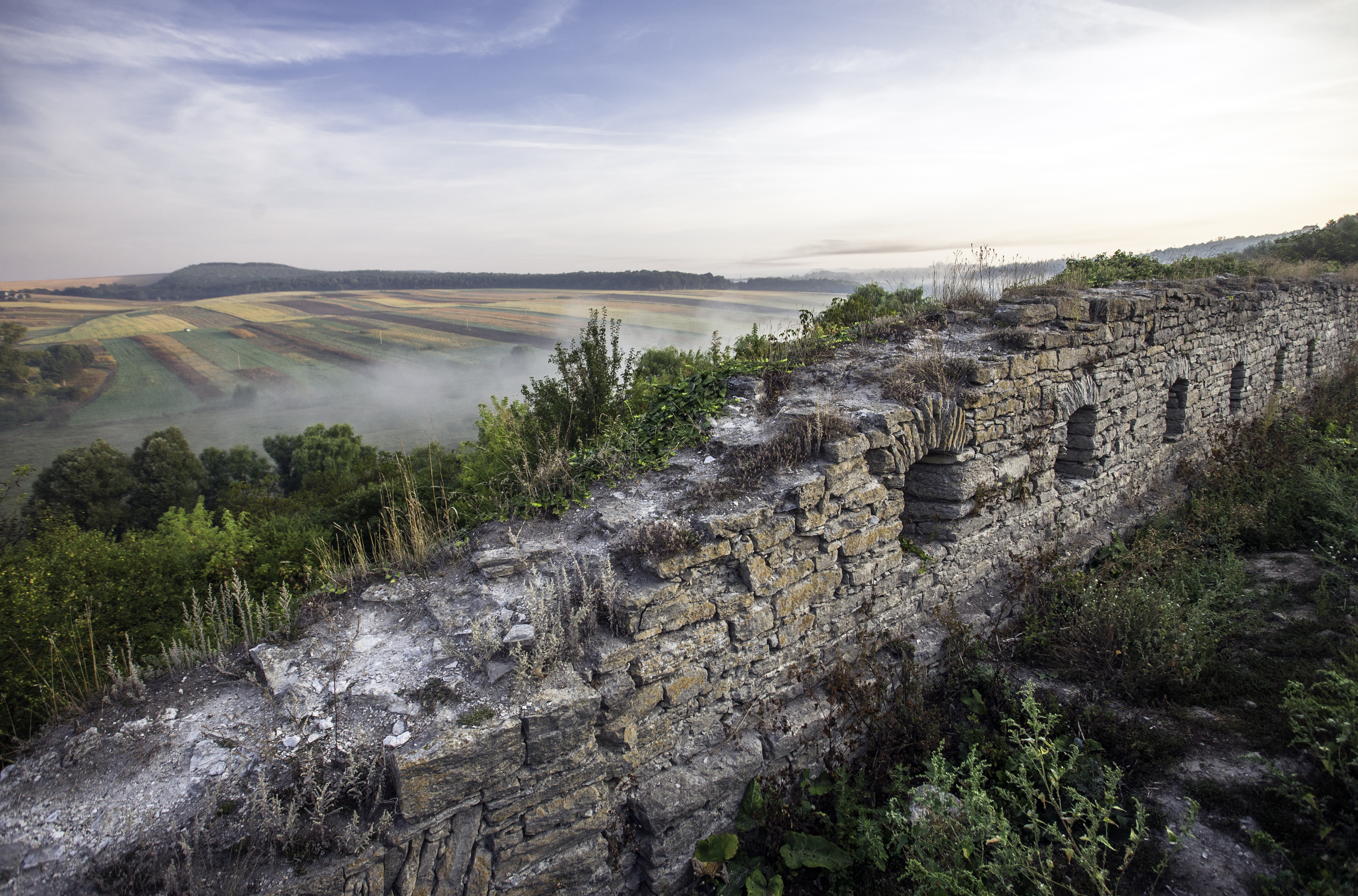

== See also ==
- Kamianets-Podilskyi Castle
- Khotyn Fortress
- Chortkiv Castle
- Skala-Podilska Castle
- Kryvche Castle
- List of castles in Ukraine

== Literature ==
- Sitsinskyi, Yukhym. Оборонні замки Західного Поділля XIV—XVII століть. — Kyiv, 1928.
- Памятники градостроительства и архитектуры Украинской ССР. — Т. 4. — Кyiv: Budivelnyk, 1986. — С. 198—199.
- Lypa Kateryna. Замок у Сатанові // Міжнародна конференція з проблем охорони фортифікаційних споруд в Україні: Матеріали. — Kamianets-Podilskyi, 1993. — С. 17—18.
- Замки долини Збруча // Країна замків і фортець. — 2nd edition. — Kamianets-Podilskyi: Оіюм, 2007. — С. 42.
- Humeniuk S. K. Замок у Сатанові // Радянське Поділля (Хмельницький). — 1967. — December 12.
- Tadeusz Polak. Zamki na kresach: Białoruś, Litwa, Ukraina. — Warszawa: Pagina, 1997. — S. 197.
