= Isaac Satanow =

Isaac Satanow (born at Satanow, Poland (currently in Ukraine), 1732; died in Berlin, Germany, 25 December 1804) was a Polish-Jewish maskil, scholar, and poet.

== Life ==
Born to a Jewish family in Satanow, in early manhood he left his native country and went to Berlin in search of learning. There he became the protégé of Daniel Itzig and David Friedländer, who found him employment as a teacher in some prominent families.

Satanow represents a peculiar type. Like Byron, he was, both physically and mentally, a conglomeration of contrasts. He dressed in the garb of the Polish Jew of the period, yet was a thorough German in his actions and habits. Though Orthodox in his beliefs, he nevertheless favored Reform in practise. He was one of the greatest authorities on Jewish tradition and lore, yet he was one of the most free-thinking of philosophers. He was a shrewd physicist and an inspired poet; a realist and an idealist.

== Work ==
In his Mishle Asaf, he so blended the style of the Bible with modern fine writing that the critics of his time were at a loss how to characterize the work. Some were inclined to revere it as a relic of antiquity, while others attacked the author as a literary charlatan who desired to palm off his own work as a production of the ancient writers. Rabbi Joseph ben Meir Teomim gave a clever criticism :

"I do not really know to whom to ascribe these sayings [of the "Mishle Asaf"]; it may be the publisher himself has composed them; for I know him to be a plagiarist. He, however, differs from the rest of that class in this respect, that they plagiarize the works of others and pass them for their own, while he plagiarizes his own works and passes them for those of others."

While writing his Mishle Asaf, a work in which noble thoughts are expressed in the choicest diction, he did not disdain at the same time to write a treatise on how to drill holes through three hundred pearls in one day and how to mix successfully different kinds of liquors. Even in the most earnest and solemn of his writings there can always be detected an undercurrent of the most playful humor.

Satanow as a poet belongs to two distinctly different schools. In his earlier works he followed the theory of the old school, which considered plays on words, great flourish of diction, and variegated expressions as the essential requirements of good poetry; but in his later works he used the simple, forceful style of the Biblical writers, and he may be justly styled "the restorer of Biblical poetry." It is sufficient to compare his "Eder ha-Yeḳar" and "Sefer ha-Ḥizzayon" with his "Mishle Asaf" to see at a glance the difference in style.

Among Satanow's most important works are the following:

- "Sifte Renanot," a brief exposition of Hebrew grammar (Berlin, 1773).
- "Sefer ha-Ḥizzayon" (ib. 1775 [?]), in eight parts: part i., a treatise on criticism and knowledge; ii., on poetry; iii., a collection of proverbs; iv., treatises on different scientific topics: a discussion about the visual and auditory senses, from which he makes a digression, and discusses the inhabitants of the moon; v., discussions on esthetic problems, as love, friendship, justice, etc.; vi., a picturesque description of the universe; viii., discussions on various topics. The whole work is written in a highly ornate style; it does not bear the author's name; but a few hints in some of the poems leave no doubt as to who he was.
- "Imre Binah" (ib. 1784).
- "Seliḥot," a newly arranged edition (ib. 1785).
- "Sefer ha-Shorashim," in three parts, a treatise on Hebrew roots (ib. 1787).
- "Mishle Asaf," a collection of gnomes, modeled after the Book of Proverbs (ib. 1788-91)
- "Moreh Nebukim," text together with commentary (ib. 1791-96).
- "Zemirot Asaf," with the commentary of Samuel ben Meïr (ib. 1793). This was the first attempt of the Slavonic school to build up a national lyric poetry, although the psalms have the form rather of philosophic reflections than of lyric expression. No references to national history or national lore, and no expressions of patriotism, are to be found in them. They form a simple doxology, and reflect a rational view of nature as opposed to mysticism.
- "Pirḳe Shirah," on the natural sciences.
- Additions to Menahem ben Avraham of Perpignan's Sefer haGdarim (1798).
