= Parsky =

Parsky is a surname. Notable people with the surname include:

- Gerry Parsky (born 1942), American financier, philanthropist, and public servant
- Dmitri Parsky (1866–1921), Russian general

== See also ==
- Leo Parskey (1915–1994), justice of the Connecticut Supreme Court
- Persky, a surname
