= Rebbe =

Orthodox rabbinic title, especially in Hasidism

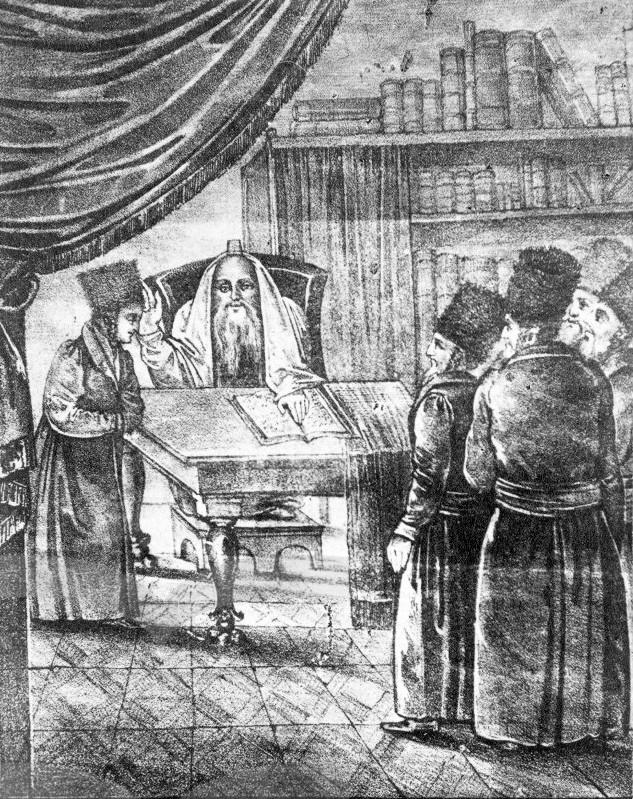
Rabbi Yisroel Hopstein of Kozienice

A rebbe (Yiddish: רבי, romanized: rebe) or admor (Hebrew: אדמו״ר) is the spiritual leader in the Hasidic movement, and the personalities of its dynasties. The titles of rebbe and admor, which used to be a general honorific even before the beginning of the movement, became, over time, almost exclusively identified with its Tzadikim.

== Usage ==
Today, rebbe is used in the following ways:

1. Rabbi, a teacher of Torah: Yeshiva students or cheder (elementary school) students, when talking to their teacher, would address him with the honorific Rebbe, as the Yiddish-German equivalent to the Hebrew word rabbi (רַבִּי rabi [ˈʁabi]).
2. Personal mentor and teacher: A person's main Rosh Yeshiva, Yeshiva teacher, or mentor, who teaches him or her Talmud and Torah and gives religious guidance, is referred to as rebbe (/ˈrɛbə/), also as an equivalent to the term "rabbi".
3. Spiritual leader: The spiritual head of a Hasidic movement is called a rebbe (/ˈrɛbə/). His followers would address him as "The Rebbe" or refer to him when speaking to others as "the Rebbe" or "my Rebbe". He is referred to by others as the Rebbe of a particular Hasidic dynasty. In Hebrew, a Hasidic rebbe is often referred to as an AdMoR, which is an abbreviation for Adoneinu, Moreinu, veRabbenu ("Our Master, our Teacher, and our Rabbi"). In writing, this title is placed before the name of the Hasidut, as in "Admor of Belz"; while the title Rebbe comes after the name of the Hasidut when used as an adjective, as in "Lubavitcher Rebbe", "Amshinever Rebbe", and every rebbe of every Hasidic dynasty. In the Litvishe world, when not referring to a hasidic rebbe (/ˈrɛbə/), the word can be pronounced "rebbee" (/ˈrɛbi/). Sephardic Jews can pronounce it as "Ribbi" (/ˈriːbi/). The Lubavitcher hasidim have a tradition that the Hebrew letters that make up the word rebbe (/ˈrɛbi/) are also an acronym for "Rosh Bnei Yisroel", meaning "a spiritual head of the Children of Israel".

An ordinary communal rabbi, or rebbe in Yiddish, is sometimes distinct from a rav (/ˈrɑːv/, also pronounced rov /ˈrɒv/ by Jews of Eastern European or Russian origin), who is a more authoritative halakhic decider. A significant function of a rav is to answer questions of halakha (the corpus of Jewish law), but he is not as authoritative as a posek. The short form reb is an honorific for Orthodox Jewish men, who are most likely to have profound knowledge of the Talmud and Torah, as opposed to Reconstructionist, Reform or Conservative Judaism. Originally, this title was added to the names of Jews at the time of the schism with the Karaite sect, as a sign of loyalty to the original rabbinic tradition, known today as Orthodox Judaism.

== Hasidism ==
As a rule, among hasidim, rebbe (/ˈrɛbə/) is referred to in Hebrew as admor (pl. admorim), an abbreviation for Hebrew adoneinu moreinu v'rabeinu (Hebrew: אדמו"ר acronym for אדוננו מורנו ורבנו), meaning "our master, our teacher, and our rabbi", which is now the modern Hebrew word in Israel for rebbe.

Hasidim use the term rebbe also in a more elevated manner, to denote someone that they perceive not only as the religious leader or nasi of their congregation, but as their spiritual adviser and mentor. The Rebbe or my Rebbe in this sense is a rav or rabbi whose views and advice are accepted not only on issues of religious law and practice, but in all arenas of life, including political and social issues. Sometimes a Hasid has a rebbe as his spiritual guide and an additional rav for rulings on issues of halakha.

Hasidim use the concept of a (non-Hasidic) rebbe in the simple sense of rabbi, as the Yiddish-German equivalent to the Hebrew word רַבִּי rabi [ˈʁäbi]. For example: "I will ask my rebbe (/ˈrɛbə/), Rabbi (/ˈræbaɪ/) Ploni (so-and-so), for advice about this personal matter."

== The Hasidic rebbe ==
Hannah Rachel Verbermacher, known as the Maiden of Ludmir, was the only female rebbe in the history of the Hasidic movement.

A Hasidic rebbe (/ˈrɛbɛ/) is generally taken to mean a great leader of a Hasidic dynasty, also referred to as "Grand Rabbi" in English or an ADMOR, a Hebrew acronym for Adoneinu-Moreinu-veRabbeinu ("our lord/master, teacher, and rabbi"). Outside of Hasidic circles, the term "Grand Rabbi" has been used to refer to a rabbi with a higher spiritual status. The practice became widespread in America in the early 1900s when Hasidic rebbes began to emigrate to the United States and was derived from the German Grossrabbiner.

Rabbi Yisroel Baal Shem Tov, the founder of Hasidism, is regarded by Hasidim as the first Hasidic rebbe. During his lifetime he was referred to mainly as "The holy" rather than as "Rebbe", and his disciples were "magidim" or "preachers", such as the Magid of Chernobyl or the Magid of Mezritch.

The first "rebbe" to be known as such was the Baal Shem Tov's grandson, Rabbi Boruch of Mezhibozh, who was referred to as "The Rebbe" during his lifetime. After him, those who rose to positions of leadership and their successors began to be called rebbe. The title gradually came to suggest a higher spiritual status.

Each Hasidic group refers to its leader as "the rebbe".

Hannah Rachel Verbermacher, also known as the Maiden of Ludmir or the "Ludmirer Moyd", was the only female rebbe in the history of the Hasidic movement; she lived in the 19th century in Ukraine and Israel.

=== Relationship of Hasidim to their rebbe ===
==== Rebbe as tzadik ====
According to Maimonides, a tzadik is "one whose merit surpasses [his/her] iniquity", and every person can reach the level of a Tzadik. According to the Tanya, a tzadik has no evil inclination, and only a select few predestined to attain this level can attain it. According to Kabbalah (and particularly the Hasidic understanding of Kabbalah), the world is sustained on the "shoulders" of Tzadikim Nistarim, divinely predestined exceptionally righteous people in a generation. Nobody knows who was such a tzaddik, even one of these exceptionally righteous people would not know that they are such a tzadik. These people are understood to have perfected their service of God to such an extent that they become literally and physically aware of God. These righteous people's perception (of both spiritual and physical, not to mention temporal matters) transcends the apparent boundaries of existence.

However, a Hasidic rebbe is generally said to be a righteous person, called a "tzaddik". Furthermore, a rebbe is said to be able to affect divine providence, and a rebbe is said to be able to "see the future", or at least have strong insight into the life and trials of another.

As a result, Hasidim in some Hasidic circles seek their rebbe's advice for a variety of concerns: spiritual, physical, and even business concerns. Furthermore, many people seek the blessing (bracha) of a rebbe (and a Hasid will specifically seek the blessing of his rebbe) for anything, from minor (and all the more so major) physical troubles, to grand spiritual concerns.

==== Tzadik HaDor ====
In some movements the Hasidim believe that their rebbe is the "tzadik hador" (tzaddik of the generation) and would regard any thought that detracts from his perfection and holiness as heresy. Other sects lessen this idealization to some degree or another. Since many rebbes are sons-in-law or students of other rebbes, it makes sense that they would view themselves as subordinate to those other rebbes. Nonetheless, their Hasidim remain loyal to them because of their special loyalty, a family connection, or a belief that a specific tzaddik or Nasi HaDor (although others might have greater spiritual stature) connects best with one's soul. For example, the Kosover Rebbe makes yearly pilgrimages to the Tosher Rebbe. Nonetheless, his followers remain very loyal to him.

==== Rebbe as conduit ====
Unlike rabbis or non-Hasidic rebbes in other Jewish movements, Hasidic Judaism considers a "Hasidic rebbe" to be a conduit between Jews and God. based on traditional Kabbalistic concepts and terminology, Hasidic philosophy bridged deveikut, a Jewish concept referring to closeness to God, to the Hasidic rebbe, embodying and channeling the Divine flow of blessing to the world, because Creation is dependent on the continuous flow of Divine lifeforce, without which it would revert to nothingness.

==== Hasidic followers of a rebbe ====
Given a rebbe's physical awareness of God and the rebbe's transcendent perception of Godliness, many Hasidim take special care to observe their rebbe's specific and sometimes minute practices. Even things that seem mundane may nonetheless be seen by Hasidim as incredibly significant. For example, Lubavitcher Hasidim frequently shape their fedoras to match the way that the Lubavitcher Rebbe shaped his hat, which was more flat than many others. Many Skverer Hasidim (of the Skverer Rebbe in New Square) wear their peyos identical to those of the Skverer Rebbe.

While Hasidim do not always follow the specific practices of their rebbe, the rebbe can create practices that may be specific and unique to his Hasidim. For example, Rabbi Aaron Roth (Reb Areleh, as he was called) the first rebbe of Shomer Emunim, told his Hasidim to pause frequently while eating their meals to keep them from overindulging. A Hasid will usually display love and admiration for their rebbe as they would a close family member, if not more so. However, the degree and nature of this belief vary depending on the movement.

=== Functions of a Hasidic rebbe ===
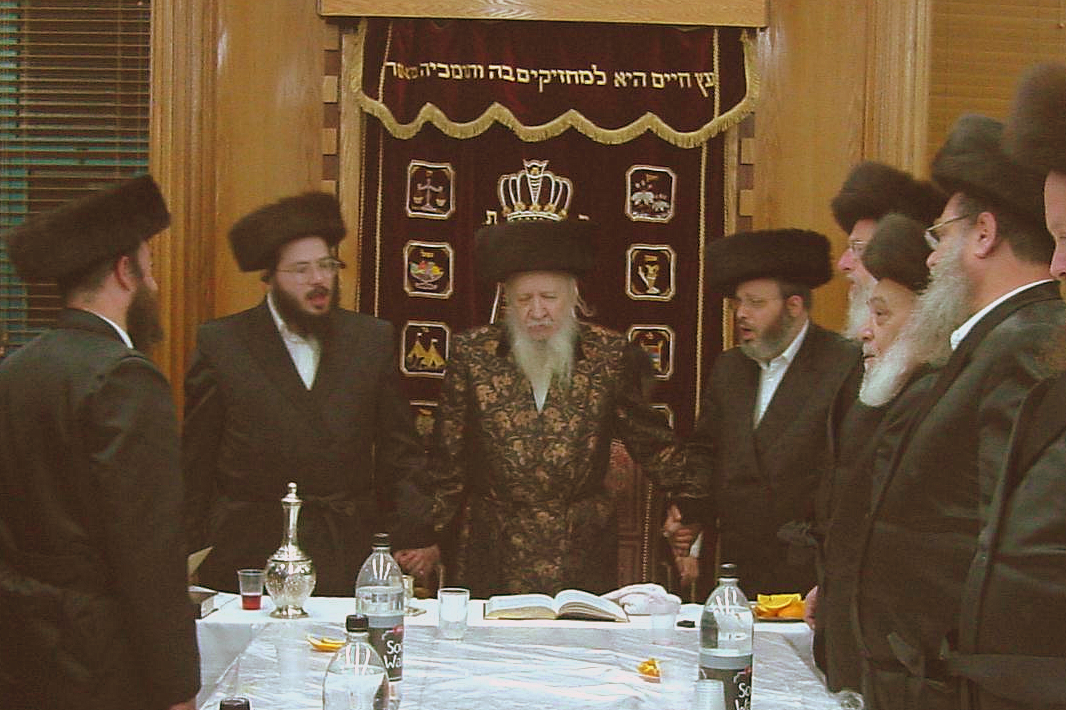
The Bostoner Rebbe feert tish, lit. "runs [a] table" in his synagogue in Beitar Illit

There are some functions that are exclusively the domain of Hasidic rebbes:

A rebbe conducts a tish (Yiddish: פֿירט טיש: feert tish, literally, "to run [a] table") or a farbrengen—a communal festive meal with highly mystical overtones—on Shabbat and other occasions. At a tish, the rebbe distributes shirayim (lit. 'remnants') to the Hasidim seated at or gathered around the table. When a gathering similar to a tish is led by a rabbi who is not a rebbe (i.e. a Mashpia), it can be referred to as a botte (esp. amongst groups from Romania) or sheves Achim.

A rebbe has times when Hasidim (and other petitioners) may come for a private audience. A kvitel (Yiddish for "note", plural kvitlach) is a note with the name of the petitioner and a short request for which the rebbe is asked to pray. The formula in which a person's name is written is one's own Hebrew name, the son/daughter of one's mother's Hebrew name, such as Shimon ben Rivkah (Simeon the son of Rebecca). Hasidim believes that rebbes read supernaturally "between the lines" of a kvitel, and in every Hasidic movement there are numerous anecdotes relating how the rebbe saw things that were not written in the kvitel.

In most Hasidic groups, the kvitel is written by the rebbe's gabbai (secretary), however, sometimes the petitioner writes it on his own. Usually, but with some exceptions, a pidyon (redemption) of cash is customarily handed to the rebbe under the kvitel, but this is not obligatory. This is considered to be the conduit through which the blessing is given, and a redemption for the soul of the petitioner. ("A gift makes its receiver glad" is given as an explanation: a blessing only comes from a joyous heart.) It is also customary to tip the gabbai, although this too is not obligatory.

Other tasks are not exclusive to Hasidic rebbes but are important roles they play in their community similar to other rabbis. These include the leading of prayer on Shabbat and Holy Days, performing mitzvot with their Hasidim, and participating in or officiating at weddings, brit milahs, and other events. Hasidic rebbes also play a central role in the intellectual and social life of their communities, delivering sermons and dialogues and building educational and religious institutions.

=== Typology of Hasidic rebbes ===
Zalman Schachter-Shalomi theorized that the historical Hasidic Rebbes may be viewed as occupying one or several of the following roles or functions about their support of their followers:

- The Rav: This role refers to Hasidic Rebbes who also served as ordained rabbis serving Jewish communities. Examples of this type cited by Schachter-Shalom include Shmelke of Nikolsburg and Pinchas Horowitz. For some Hasidic Rebbes, such as Chaim Halberstam of Sanz, the term Rav was used instead of Rebbe.
- The Good Jew: This role, known in Yiddish as the Guter Yid, refers to a popular Hasidic Rebbe who is viewed as enjoying God's favor and whose legacies spoke to the conditions of struggling Hasidim. This role was viewed as a continuation of the Talmudic legacy of individuals such as Honi HaMe'agel. Examples of Hasidic Rebbes of this type cited include Aryeh Leib of Shpola and Berishil of Krakow.
- The Seer: This role, known in Hebrew as the Chozeh, refers to a Hasidic Rebbe was ascribed prophetic powers. Examples of this type cited include the Seer of Lublin and his student Tzvi Hirsh of Zidichov.
- The Miracle Worker: This role, known in Hebrew as the Ba'al Mofet, was often assumed by Hasidim to involve expertise in Practical Kabbalah. Examples cited include Ber of Radoshitz.
- The Healer: This role is understood as involving more than mere healing but also involved the expectation that the Hasid would alter his behavior to merit healing.
  - The Gaon: A variant of the healer-type was the Talmudic genius (gaon) who could offer blessing through the merit of his Talmudic study. This tradition was not limited to Hasidism but also was applied to non-Hasidic rabbis such as Yechezkel Landau of Prague and the Gaon of Vilna.
- The Son or Grandson of the Tzaddik: This role applied to Hasidic Rebbes who would utilize ancestral merit of a Hasidic predecessor to invoke blessing. In Yiddish, the term einykel (grandson) would sometimes be used. Often, this role involved the use of petitions at the gravesite of the Hasidic predecessor. Examples cited of this type include Boruch of Medzhybizh who was the grandson of the Baal Shem Tov, the founder of Hasidism.
- The Block Rebbe: This type is viewed to have developed in New York City from 1900 to 1940 and involved a grandfatherly role to local Jewish residents.
- The Kabbalist: This role, also known in Hebrew as the Ba'al M'kubal, involved expertise in the theoretical teachings of Jewish mysticism. Examples cited include Shneur Zalman of Lyady (the founder of Chabad Hasidism), Yisroel Hopstein (the Maggid of Kozhnitz), and Isaac of Komarno.
- The Spiritual Guide: This role, known in Hebrew as the Moreh Derekh ("Teacher of the Path"), reflects the Hasidic notion that Rebbe is the expert on matters of the Love and Fear of God. The Hasidic Rebbe Aharon Roth reportedly insisted on the use of this term. While Schachter-Shalom notes that Hasidim valued the living guide over the use of books, some Rebbes, such as Dovber of Lubavitch, wrote various tracts for different types of spiritual seekers.
- The Tzaddik of the Generation: This role, known in Hebrew as Tzaddik HaDor, or Rashey Alafim ("Head of Thousands"), invokes the stature of Biblical leaders and is viewed mystically as the conduit of all blessing for the Jewish people of that generation.

== See also ==
- List of Hasidic dynasties
