= Joseph Hirsh Palitschinetzki =

Jewish Biblical scholar

- Born: 1805
- Died: 27 November 1886 (aged 80–81); Berdichev, Kiev Governorate, Russian Empire
- Writing career
- Language: Hebrew

Joseph Hirsh Palitschinetzki (Yiddish: יוסף צבי הירש בן משה שלום פאליטשינעצקי; 1805 – 27 November 1886) was a Jewish Biblical scholar.

He was instructor in the Bible in the rabbinical seminary at Zhitomir until its close, and was an assiduous student throughout his life. Palitschinetzki was the author of Ḳero miḳra (Zhitomir, 1874), on Biblical Hebrew and various other Biblical subjects. In this work, as well as in his articles contributed to different periodicals, he evinces a wide knowledge of the Hebrew language and literature. He left a number of unpublished works in manuscript.

== Publications ==
- Ḳero miḳra (in Hebrew). Zhitomir: Yitsḥak Moshe Baksht. 1874.
