= Sataniv =

Rural locality in Khmelnytskyi Oblast, Ukraine

Sataniv Сатанів
- Rural settlement
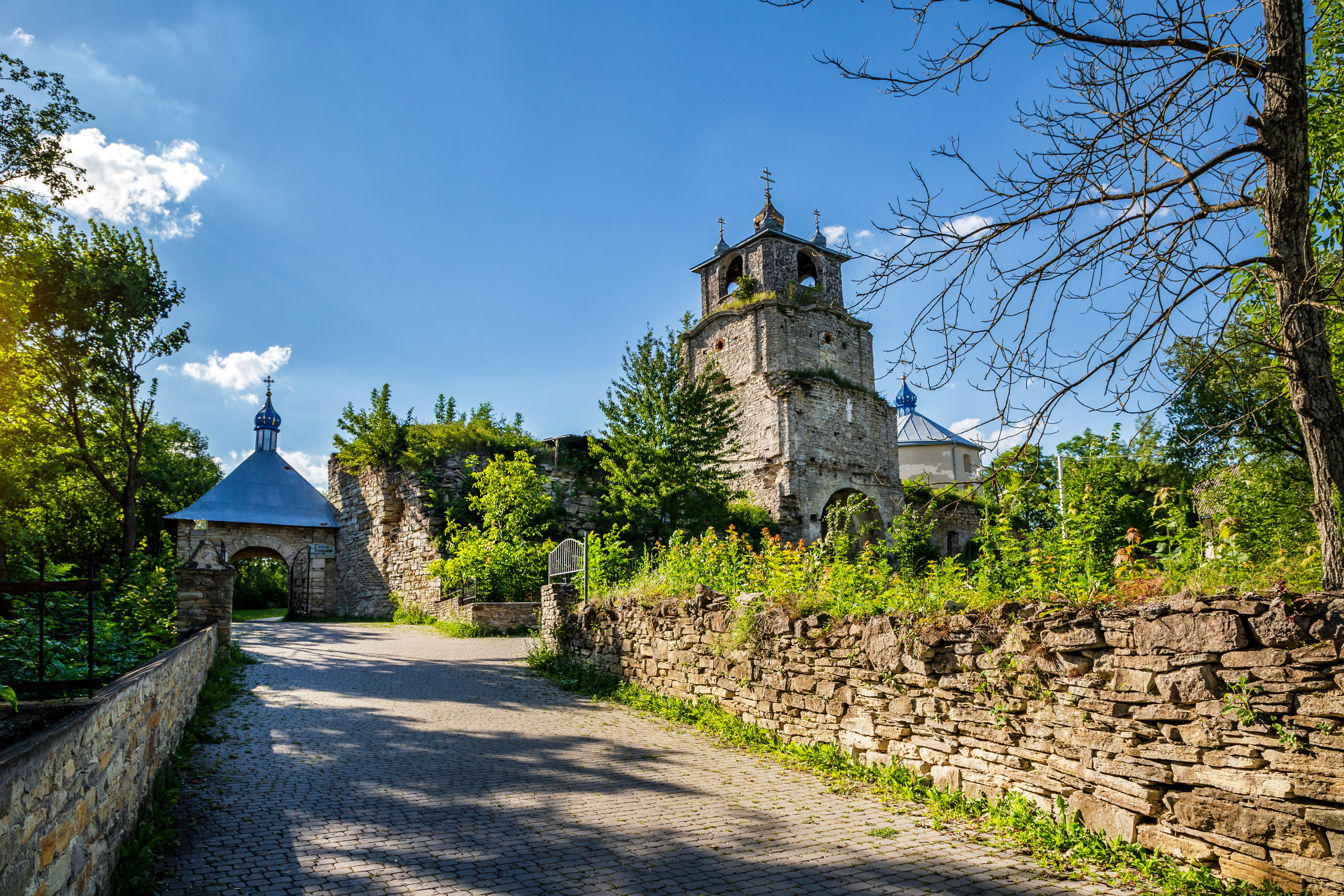
- Holy Trinity convent

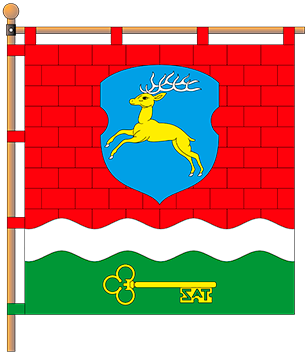
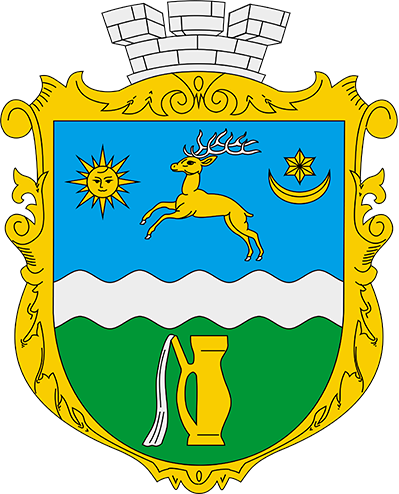
- Flag Coat of arms

- Location of Sataniv Sataniv (Ukraine)
- Coordinates: 49°15′05″N 26°15′52″E
- Country: Ukraine
- Oblast: Khmelnytskyi Oblast
- Raion: Khmelnytskyi Raion
- Hromada: Sataniv settlement hromada

Population (2022)
  - Total: 2,341

Sataniv (Ukrainian: Сатанів, Ukrainian pronunciation: [ˈsatɐnʲiu̯]; Russian: Сатанов; Polish: Satanów; Yiddish: סאָטענעוו, romanized: Satanov) is a rural settlement in Khmelnytskyi Raion, Khmelnytskyi Oblast, Ukraine. It hosts the administration of Sataniv settlement hromada, one of the hromadas of Ukraine. Population: 2,341 (2022 estimate).

== History ==
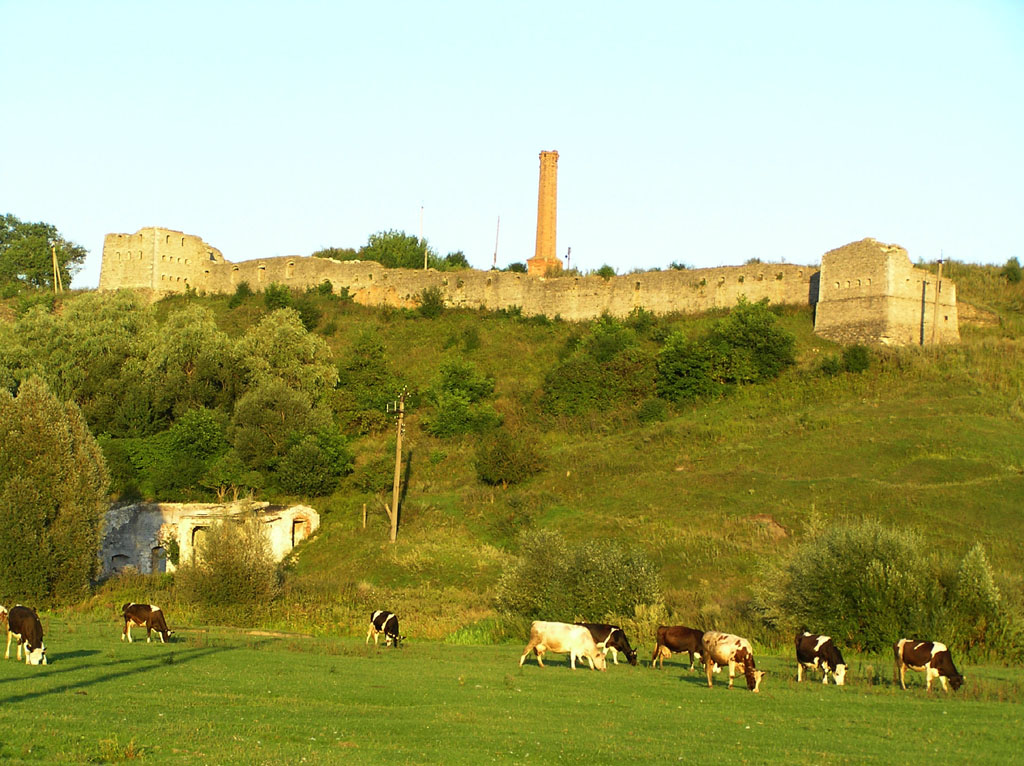
Sataniv Castle

Known in historical documents since 1404, Sataniv was part of the Grand Duchy of Lithuania, Polish–Lithuanian Commonwealth, Ottoman Empire, Russian Empire, Ukrainian People's Republic, Soviet Union, and after the latter's dissolution, became part of independent Ukraine. The town over the Zbruch River and its surroundings have been the scene of military actions during the Khmelnytsky Uprising, World War I, Ukrainian War of Independence, and World War II. As noted by Kateryna Lypa, "the history of Sataniv is typical of a small border town-fortress, where periods of terrible destruction alternated with periods of prosperity, flourishing in trade and crafts".

Sataniv was a village, a town, a city, then a town again, and in 1938, it acquired the status of an urban-type settlement. It once enjoyed Magdeburg rights, and from the late 1920s to 1959, it was the district center.

In 1985, Sataniv was recognized as a resort of republican significance. In 2001, it was included in the List of historical settlements of Ukraine. Sataniv is part of one of the Seven Natural Wonders of Ukraine — the largest in Europe, the national natural park "Podilski Tovtry", established on 27 June 1996.

=== Foundation ===
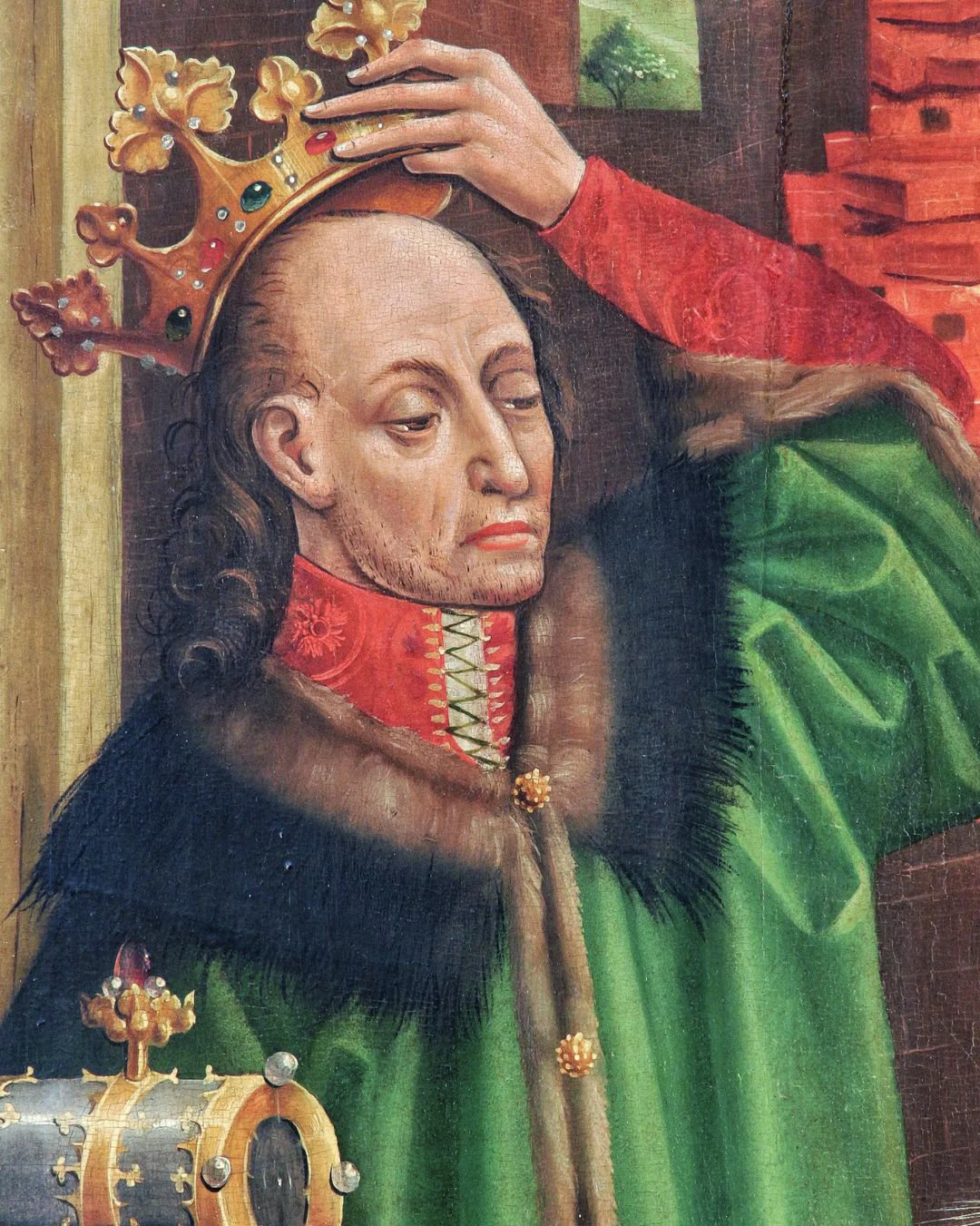
Władysław II Jagiełło

The exact founding date of Sataniv is unknown. The earliest written mention of it dates back to 1404. The first mention of the settlement named Szatanów is in a charter by the Polish king Władysław II Jagiełło to Kraków's Podstoli Piotr Szafraniec. This charter, written in Latin, was published in 1894 in the second volume of the eighth part of the "Archive of Southwestern Russia", published in Kyiv by the Temporary Commission for the Arrangement of Ancient Acts, founded at the Kyiv, Podolia, and Volhynia Governor-General. The documents of this volume were prepared for publication by Mykhailo Hrushevsky. The charter is cited from a copy written in 1564 in the book of privilege revision. During the publication of the charter, this book was stored in the Moscow Archive of the Ministry of Justice, and now it is kept in the Main Archive of Ancient Acts in Warsaw in the fund of the Lithuanian Metrica.

In 1905, another copy of the charter issued to Piotr Szafraniec was published by the Polish historian Franciszek Piekosiński.

The year 1404 is generally recognized as the date of the first written mention of Sataniv. It is mentioned in the works of Oleksandr Stepenko, Vartan Hryhoryan, Mykola Petrov, Ivan Rybak, and other historians. However, some guides, reference books, and even encyclopedias claim that the first chronicle mention of Sataniv dates back to 1385, but they provide no references to support this assertion. For instance, Volodymyr Radzievsky and Vasyl Burma in the guide "Medobory" (second edition, 1975) write: "It is likely that the first information about Sataniv dates back to 1385. However, in historical documents, Sataniv is first mentioned in 1404". Similar categorical statements are made by the authors of the historical guide "100 Jewish towns" (second edition, 1998) and the third issue of the reference publication "Who's Who in Khmelnytskyi" (2005), which directly state that "the first chronicle mentions of Sataniv date back to 1385". The same categoricalness is characteristic of the "Universal Dictionary-Encyclopedia" (fourth edition, 2006), where it is stated that Sataniv "is first mentioned in the chronicle in 1385".

In December 1886, a member of the Committee for the Church-Historical and Statistical Description of the Podillia Diocese, Ivan Shipovych, wrote in the "Podolskie Eparkhialnye Vedomosti":

=== Jewish history ===
A Jewish community was organized in Sataniv in the second half of the 16th century, in the Kingdom of Poland. Jews in Sataniv were involved in the import of goods from the east, leasing of estates and customs dues, manufacture of alcoholic drinks, and goldsmithery.

The town was periodically attacked by the Tatars and Cossacks, including combined attacks in 1651 and from the Cossacks in 1703. The synagogue in Sataniv was built as a fortress to allow the Jews and the wider community to defend themselves in such attacks.

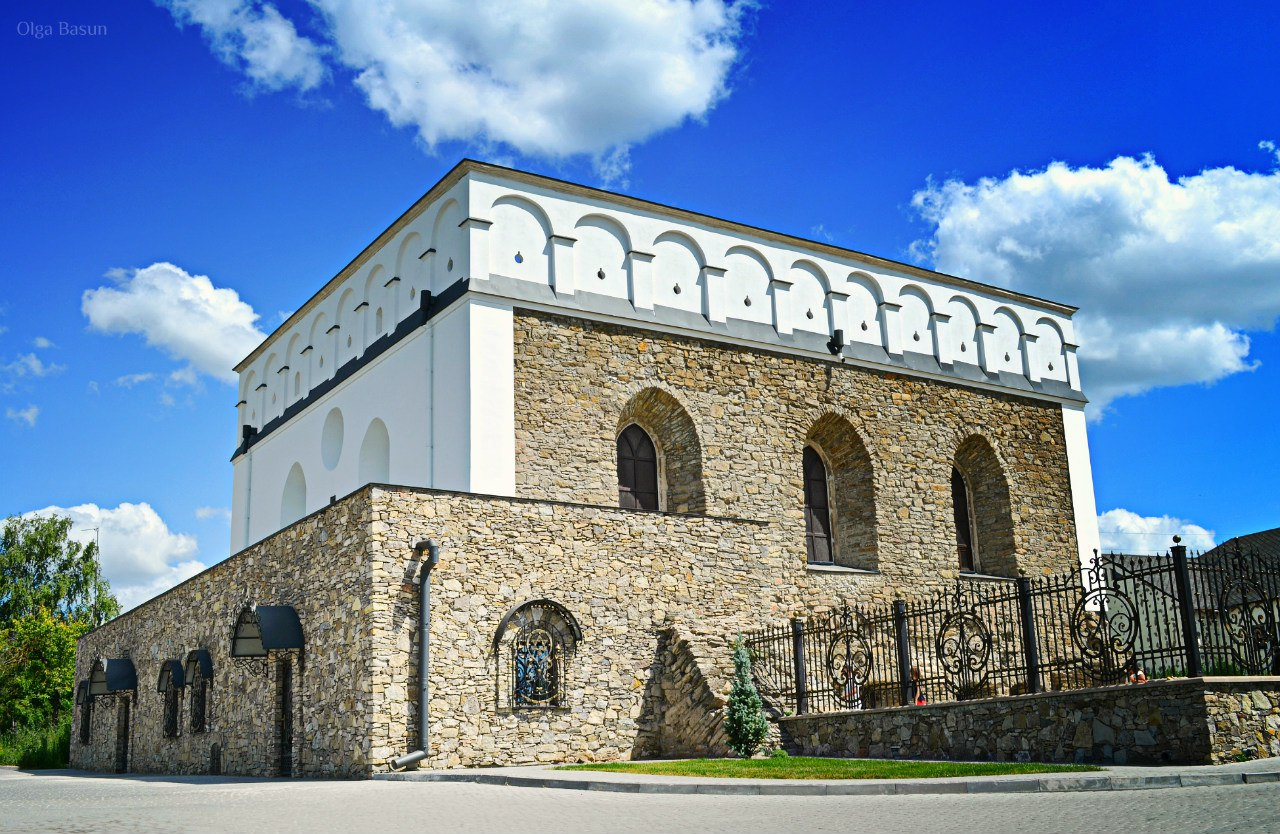
Sataniv Synagogue

In the 18th century Sataniv was Podolia's leading community. In 1756 its dayyanim (religious judges) held a trial of the Frankists. In 1765 there were 1,369 Jews paying the poll tax in Sataniv. The Jews there were involved in international commerce, traveling to fairs in Leipzig, Breslau, and Frankfurt, until the Second Partition of Poland of 1793, when Sataniv was incorporated into Russia.

The Hebrew writer and maskil Isaac Satanow lived in Sataniv, and was active there in the latter half of the 18th century. He, Menachem Mendel Lefin, and Alexander b. Ẓevi Margaliot, all of whom also lived in the town, were among the pioneers of the Haskalah movement. From the end of the 18th century and during the 19th, Sataniv was an important center of Hasidism.

Until 1862 the Jewish settlement there was restricted by the authorities, because of Sataniv's closeness to the Austrian border. The Jewish population was 2,848, 64% of the total, in 1897. In 1919, Jews in Sataniv underwent pogroms by Ukrainian nationalists. In 1926 Satanov probably had 2,359 Jews, then declining to 1,516, or 40% of the total population. A rural Jewish council existed in the Soviet period. On 6 July 1941 the Germans entered Sataniv, and on 14 [15(?)] May 1942 Ukrainian police locked 286 Jews into two cellars, letting them suffocate. (The remains of the 286 victims were found on 27 July 2020). Throughout 1942, 210 Jews were shot. The Germans murdered 800 people according to official numbers, most of them Jews.

=== 2020 onwards ===
Until 18 July 2020, Sataniv belonged to Horodok Raion. The raion was abolished in July 2020 as part of the administrative reform of Ukraine, which reduced the number of raions of Khmelnytskyi Oblast to three. The area of Horodok Raion was merged into Khmelnytskyi Raion.

Until 26 January 2024, Sataniv was designated urban-type settlement. On this day, a new law entered into force which abolished this status, and Sataniv became a rural settlement.

== See also ==
- Three hares
