= Issachar Dov-Ber Bampi =

Personal life
- Born: 1823 Minsk, Minsk Governorate, Russian Empire
- Died: 10 March 1888 (aged 64–65) Minsk, Minsk Governorate, Russian Empire

Religious life
- Religion: Judaism

Issachar Dov-Ber Bampi (Hebrew: יששכר דובער באמפּי; 1823 – March 10, 1888) was a Russian Jewish scholar, bibliophile, and philanthropist.

== Biography ==
Issachar Dov-Ber Bampi was born in Minsk in 1823. He received a comprehensive Biblical and Talmudic education, and was proficient in Hebrew. For the last thirty years of his life, Bampi delivered daily lectures on various chapters of the Bible in his private synagogue. His scholarly focus centered on tracing Jewish religious customs to their origins in both Talmuds and Midrashim. He left in manuscript the work Meḳor Minhagim ('Source of Customs') on this subject, excerpts of which were published in the yearbook Keneset Yisrael and in Ha-Kerem.

Bampi fostered relationships with both Orthodox Talmudists and progressive Maskilim. Among the scholars he supported was Kalman Schulman, who dedicated the third volume of his work Toledot Ḥakme Yisrael (Vilna, 1883) to Bampi.

He was a dedicated member of the Ḥovevei Zion of Minsk, actively contributed to various charitable institutions, and played a significant role in communal affairs. After his death, Bampi's extensive library, comprising about 6,000 volumes of mostly Hebraica, was sold to Aryeh Leib Friedland. This collection formed an important part of the Friedland collection, eventually donated by its owner to the library of the Asiatic Museum in St. Petersburg. Many of Bampi's books contain handwritten marginal notes.
