= Berish Bal-tshuve =

Yissachar Dov Ber Horowitz, known as Berish Bal-tshuve of Kraków (רבי בעריש'ל בעל תשובה מקראקא) (1931–1870) was a religious leader associated with Hasidic Judaism in Poland. Based in the Kazimierz district of Kraków, Berish Bal-tshuva served as a popular Hasidic leader, or rebbe. His moniker, "bal-tshuva" ("the penitent") referred to his joining the Hasidic movement at a young age.

In his typology of Hasidic rebbes, Zalman Schachter-Shalomi viewed Berish Bal-Tshuve as representative of the type of Hasidic leader known as the Guter Yid ("Good Jew"), and who may be viewed in the legacy of saintly Talmudic figures such as Honi HaMe'agel. These popular religious figures may be viewed as enjoying God's favor and whose legacies spoke to the conditions of struggling Hasidim.
