= Perske =

Perske is a surname. Notable persons with that name include:

- Betty Joan Perske (1924–2014), birth name of Lauren Bacall, American actress and model
- Jacquelin Perske, Australian screenwriter and producer
- Robert Perske (1927–2016), American author, theologian, and disability rights activist
- Wayne Perske (born 1974), Australian professional golfer

== See also ==
- Perski
