= Yoel Dov-Ber Perski =

Hebrew writer (1816–1871)

- יואל דוב־בער פערסקי
- Born: 1816; Volozhin, Russian Empire
- Died: 17 November 1871 (aged 54–55); Vilna, Russian Empire
- Writing career
- Language: Hebrew
- Notable works: Kevod Melakhim (1851–53); Ḥayyei Asaf (1858)

Yoel Dov-Ber Perski (Hebrew: יואל דוב־בער בן מאיר הכהן פערסקי; 1816 – 17 November 1871), also known as Yoel Ber Kohen (Hebrew: יואל בער כהן), was a Hebrew writer and translator.

His publications include Kevod Melakhim (Königsberg and Vilna, 1851–53), a translation of François Fénelon's Les aventures de Télémaque, fils d'Ulysse, and Ḥayyei Asaf (Warsaw, 1858), a translation of Aesop's Fables, along with a biography of their author. He also wrote Sefer Neveh Tehilah (1846), a Passover Haggadah with commentary; Heikhal Ra'anan and Shemen Ra'anan (Vilna, 1863), commentaries on the Yalkut Shimoni; and Battei Kehunnah, a commentary on Bereshit Rabba and Shemot Rabba.

== Partial bibliography ==
- Sefer neṿeh tehilah (PDF) (in Hebrew). Vilna: Menaḥem Mann & Simḥah Zimel. 1846.
- Kevod melakhim (in Hebrew). Vol. 1. Königsberg: A. Zamter. 1851.
- Kevod melakhim (in Hebrew). Vol. 2. Vilna: Y. R. Romm. 1853.
- Yalkut Shimʻoni: ʻim beʼur Zayit raʻanan (in Hebrew). Zensburg: M. Y. Italyener. 1856.
- Ḥaye Asaf: haʻtaḳah le-toʻelet tseʻire bene ʻamenu (in Hebrew). Warsaw: Y. Lebensohn. 1858.
- Sefer Bate kehunah: ve-huʼ beʼur maspik ʻal ha-Midrash Rabah (in Hebrew). Vilna: A. Y. & Sh. D. Dvorzets. 1871.
