= Moskalivka =

Villages:

- Moskalivka — Sumy Oblast, Romny Raion
- Moskalivka — Ternopil Oblast, Kremenets Raion, formerly (until 2020) Lanivtsi Raion
- Moskalivka — Kharkiv Oblast, Chuhuiv Raion, formerly (until 2020) Vovchansk Raion
- Moskalivka — Khmelnytskyi Oblast, Shepetivka Raion, formerly (until 2020) Bilohiria Raion
- Moskalivka — Khmelnytskyi Oblast, Khmelnytskyi Raion, formerly (until 2020) Letychiv Raion
- Moskalivka — Khmelnytskyi Oblast, Shepetivka Raion, formerly (until 2020) Polonne Raion
- Moskalivka — Khmelnytskyi Oblast, Yarmolyntsi Raion

- Moskalivka is a former village that in 1930 became part of the city of Kosiv, Ivano-Frankivsk Oblast.
- Moskalivka is a former village in the Krasnopillia Raion of Sumy Oblast.

Microdistrict:

- Moskalivka is a neighborhood in Kharkiv.
