= Pliontanism =

Painting technique with intertwined lines merging into an image

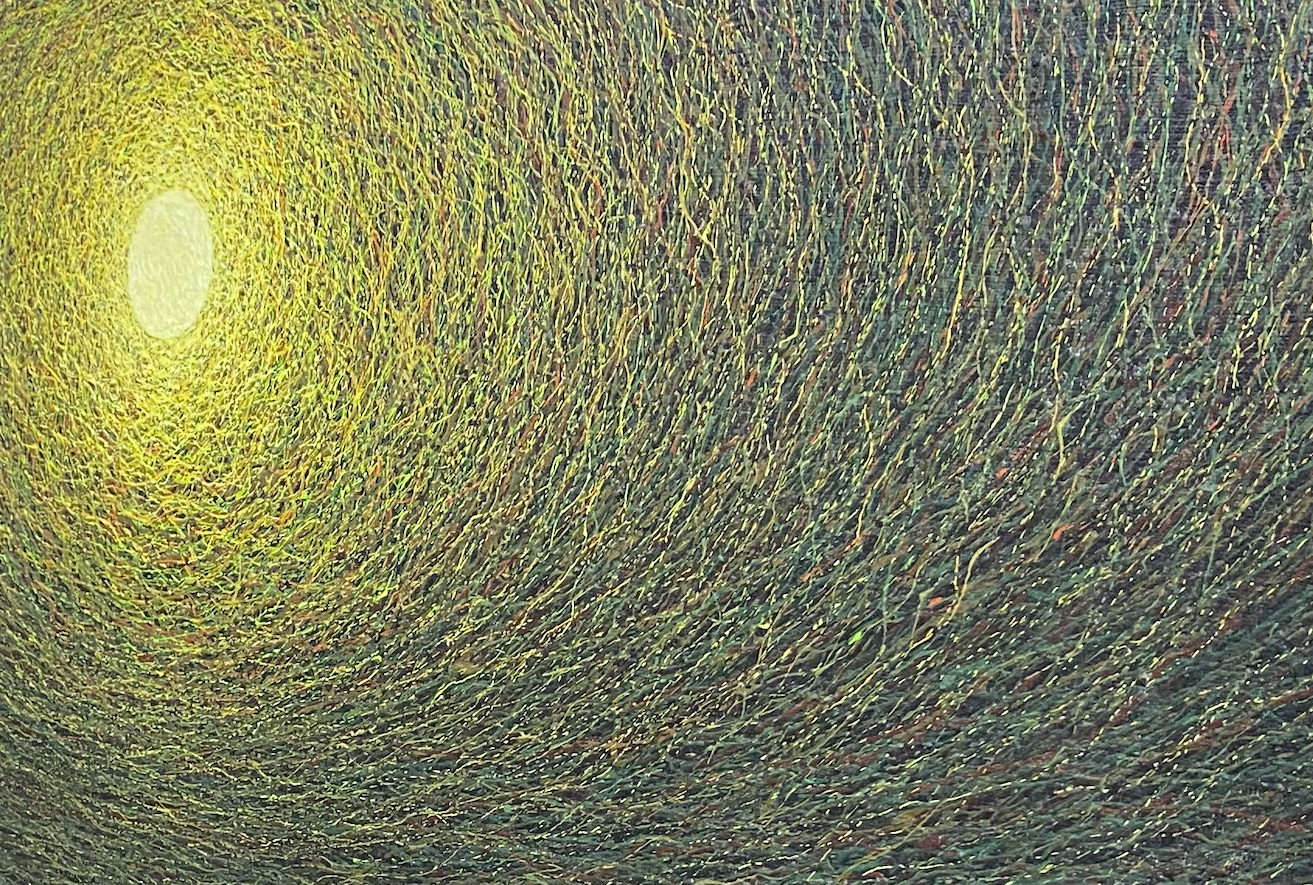
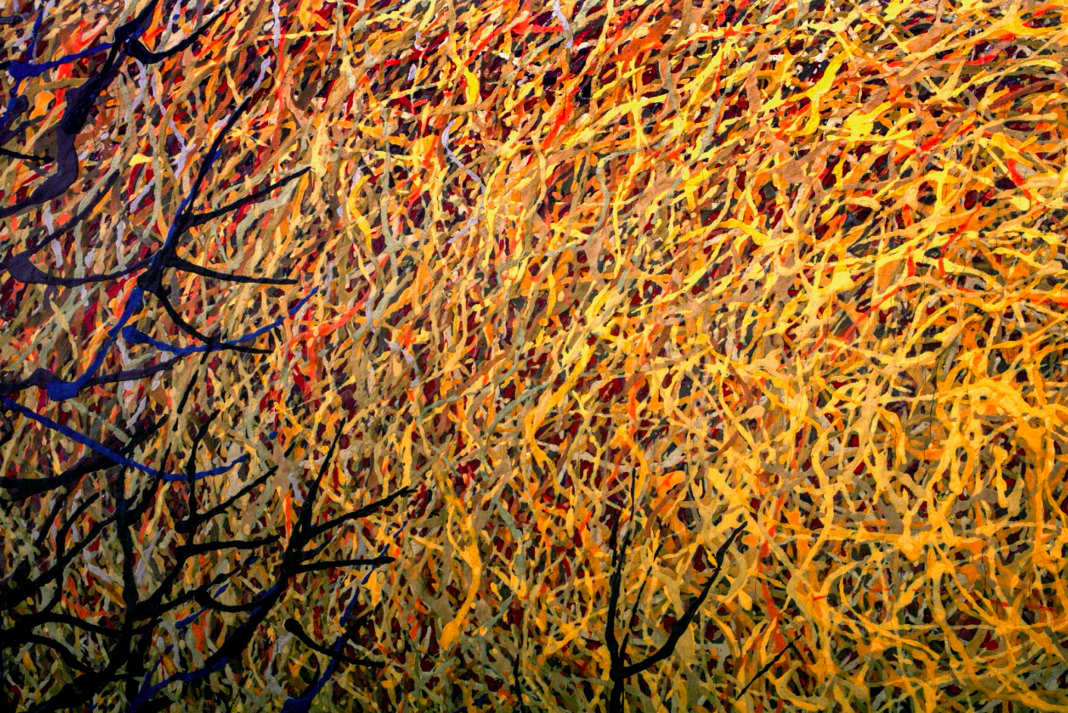
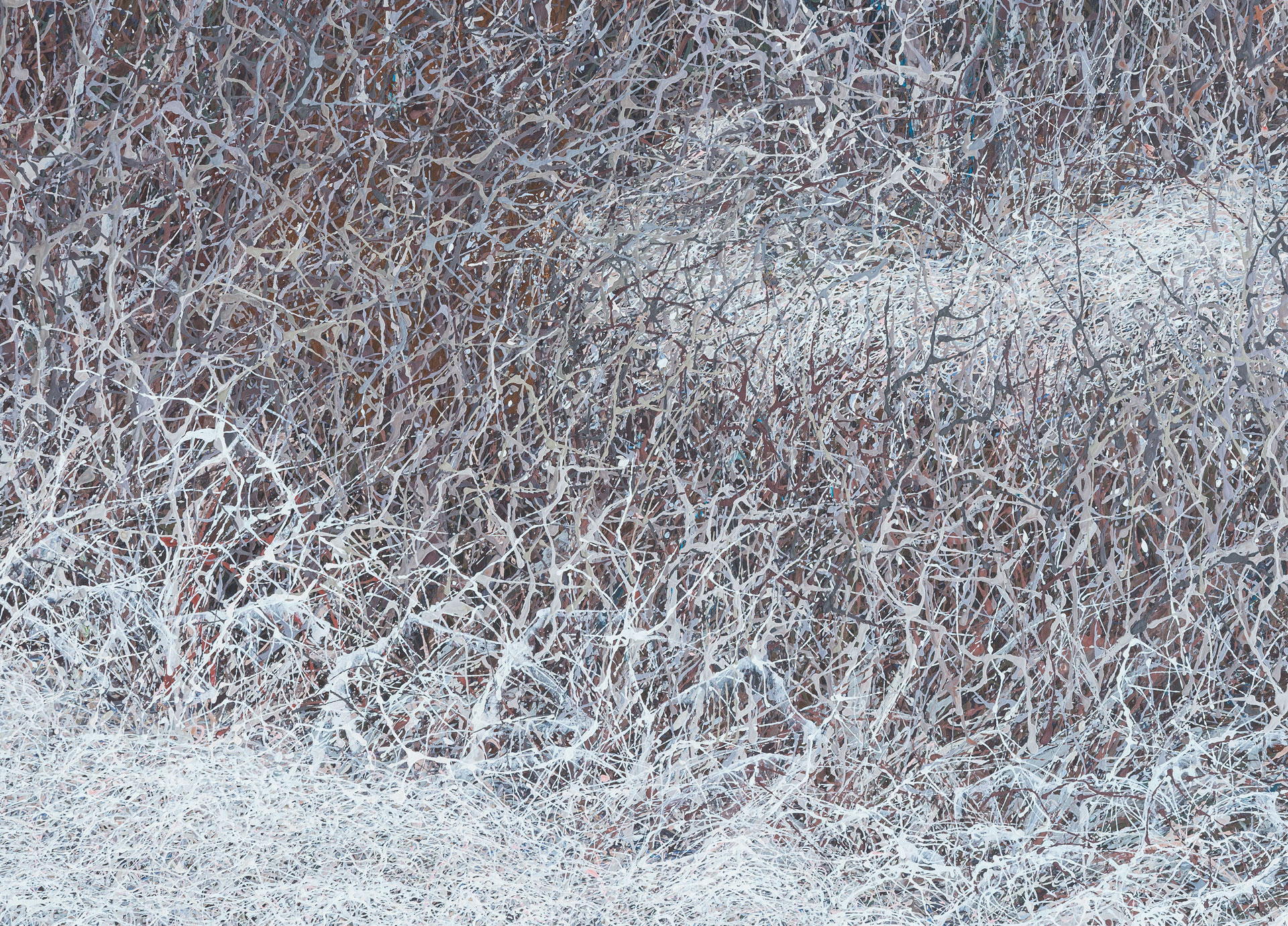
Textures in Ivan Marchuk's paintings "The Village in the Moonlight" (1984), "The Moon Rises Over the Dnipro" (1980), "And the Earth Was Covered with Snow" (1984)

Pliontanism (from the Western Ukrainian dialectism пльонтати - to weave, intertwine) is a painting technique in which thin intertwined lines merge into an image, have a dense texture and consist of web-like layers of paint.

== Information ==
The author's technique "Pliontanism" was invented by the Ukrainian artist Ivan Marchuk. This technique was first used in a landscape painting in 1972.

Its uniqueness lies in the application of paint (mainly tempera and acrylic) with thin colored lines that intertwine at different angles, which achieves the effect of volume and glow, spiritualization of images. Given the complexity of masterful execution and laboriousness, it is actually not reproducible.

Later, Pliontanism acquired the meaning of the author's creative method — an original system of world perception, as well as its transmission on canvas, which is characterized by asymmetry of rhythmic reductions in color and strokes, metaphorical and symbolism, deformation of images, which achieves the effect of the culminating tension of static images; concentration around the themes of existence, human existence, his place in the world and problems of self-knowledge.

== Gallery of works ==
No.	Picture	Name	Technique	Dimensions (cm)	Date
1.		Night in the steppe	Tempera on cardboard	58 х 70	1984
2.		Charms of the moonlit night	Acrylic paint on canvas	100 х 130	2005
3.		The sun rose over the Dnipro	Acrylic paint on canvas	100 х 130	2003
4.		The sun played its rhythms	Acrylic paint on canvas	100 х 120	2003
5.		The sun walks near the house	Tempera on cardboard	50 х 64	1982
6.		The Star of the Night Came On	Tempera on canvas	76 х 76	1990
7.		Spring waters	Tempera on canvas	80 х 100	1982
8.		Winter in Kaniv	Acrylic paint on canvas	60 х 80	2007
9.		Last Ray	Tempera on cardboard	50 х 72	1979
10.		Quiet Over the River	Tempera on cardboard	58 х 70	1978
11.		Houses illuminated by moonlight	Tempera on cardboard	40 х 30	1983
12.		Rays of the morning sun	Acrylic paint on canvas	56 х 71	2005
13.		The shadows on the road	Acrylic paint on canvas	60 х 80	2004

== Pliontanism on money ==
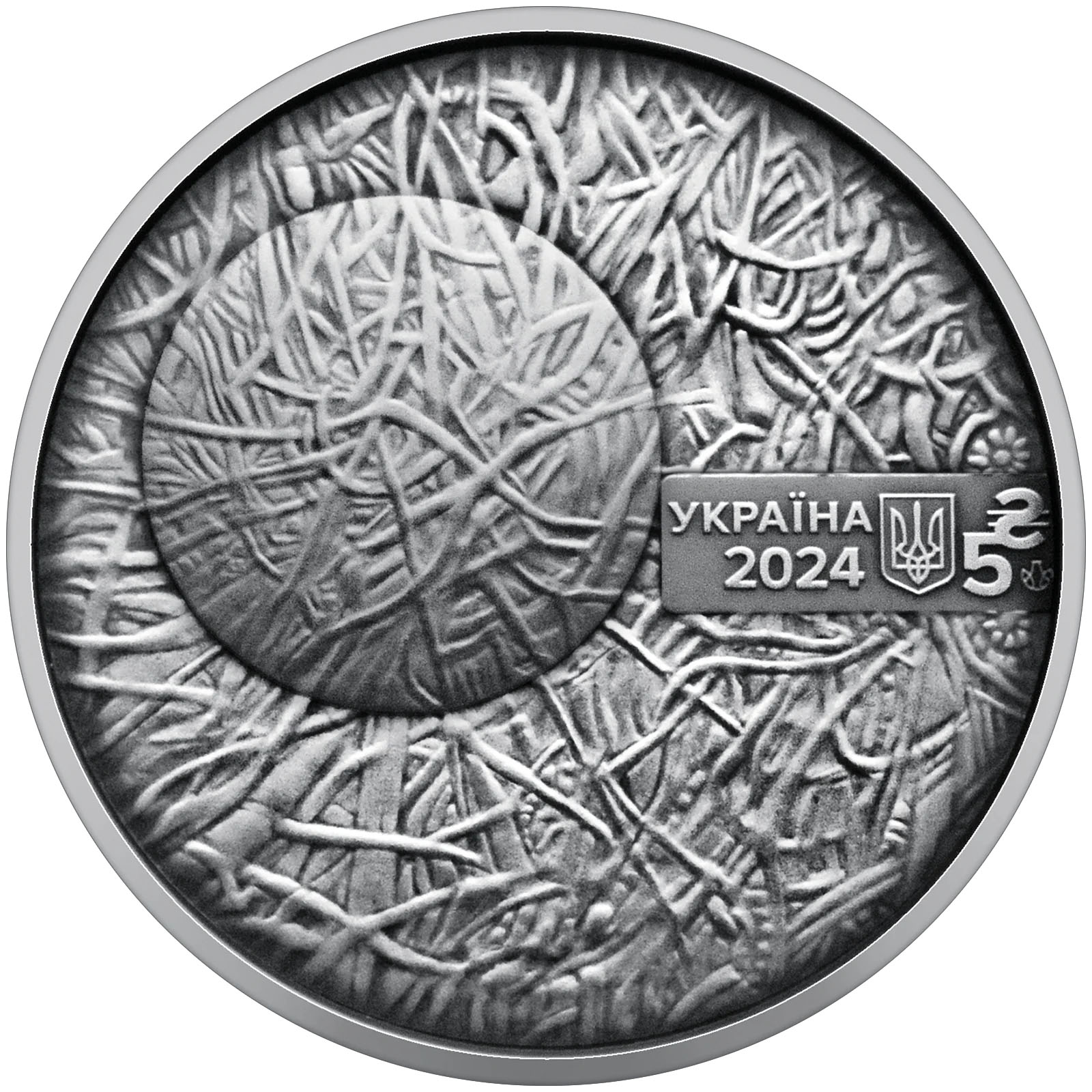
Obverse of the commemorative coin of denomination 5 hryvnia "Pliontanism (Ivan Marchuk)" National Bank of Ukraine (2024)

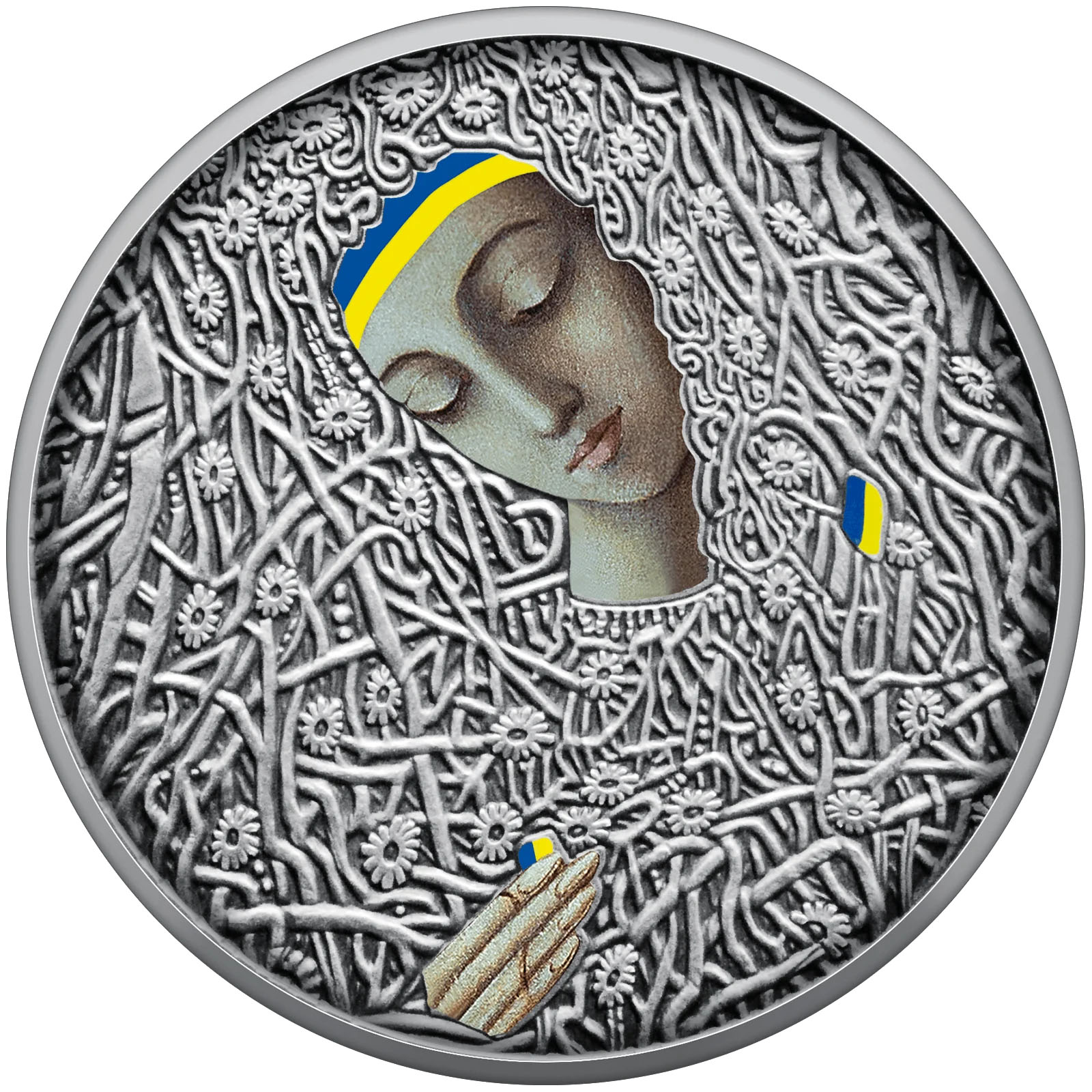
Reverse of the commemorative coin of denomination 5 hryvnia "Pliontanism (Ivan Marchuk)" National Bank of Ukraine (2024)

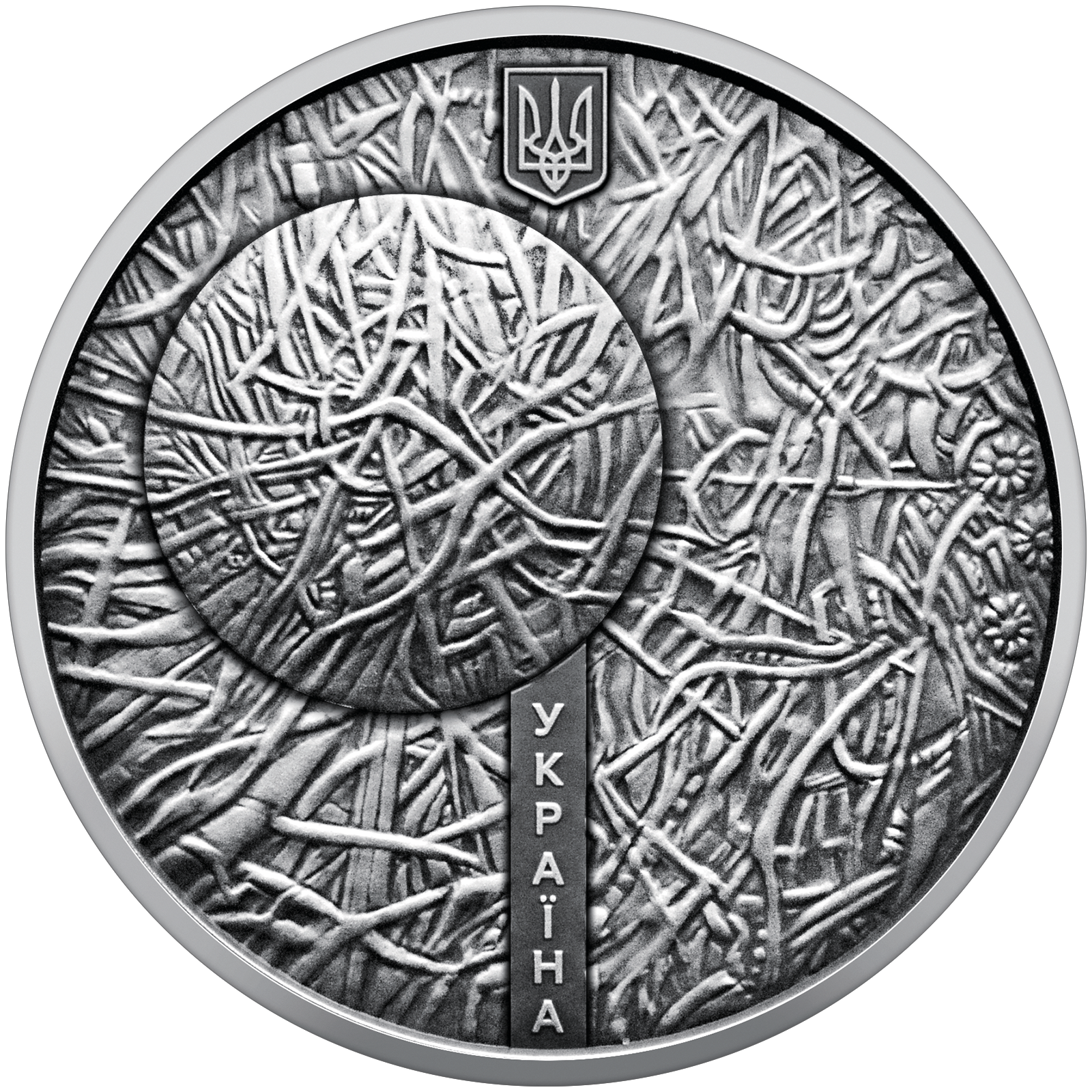
Obverse of the commemorative silver coin of denomination 10 hryvnia "Pliontanism (Ivan Marchuk)" National Bank of Ukraine (2024)

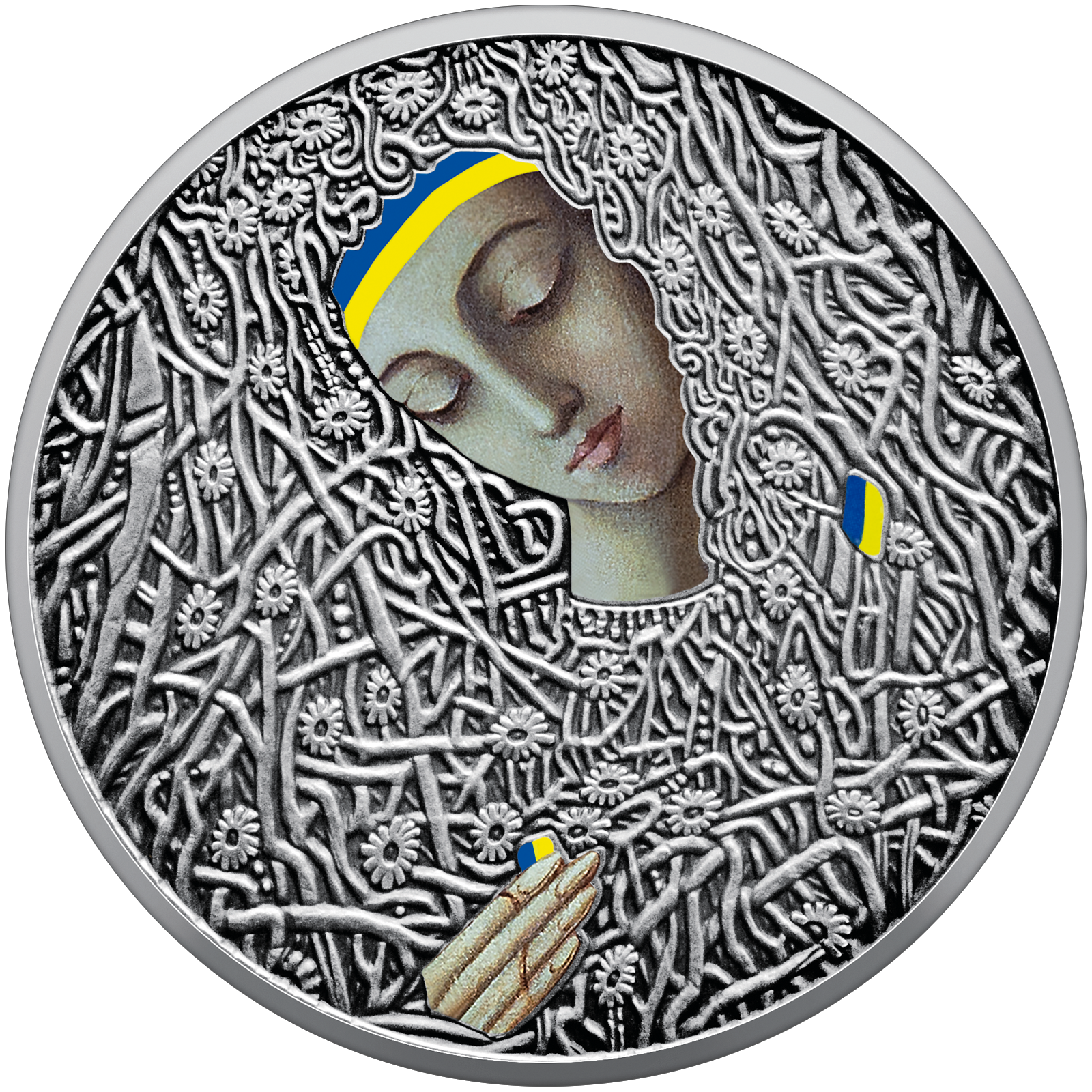
Reverse of the commemorative silver coin of denomination 10 hryvnia "Pliontanism (Ivan Marchuk)" National Bank of Ukraine (2024)

Obverse of the commemorative silver coin of 10 hryvnia denomination “Plontanism (Ivan Marchuk)” National Bank of Ukraine (2024)

== See also ==
- Shevchenkiana by Ivan Marchuk

== Sources ==
- Marcuk, Ivan Stepanovyc, Allgemeines Künstlerlexikon, De Gruyter, band 87, p. 171.
- Б. Кияк. Гіперпростір Івана Марчука. 50 років „пльонтанізму“, Світогляд, 2023, Nr. 1, p. 48—53, ISSN 1819-7329.
- "Ivan Marchuk, a Ukrainian art genius of our time".
