= Shevchenkiana by Ivan Marchuk =

Collection of arts by Ivan Marchuk

- Шевченкіана Івана Марчука
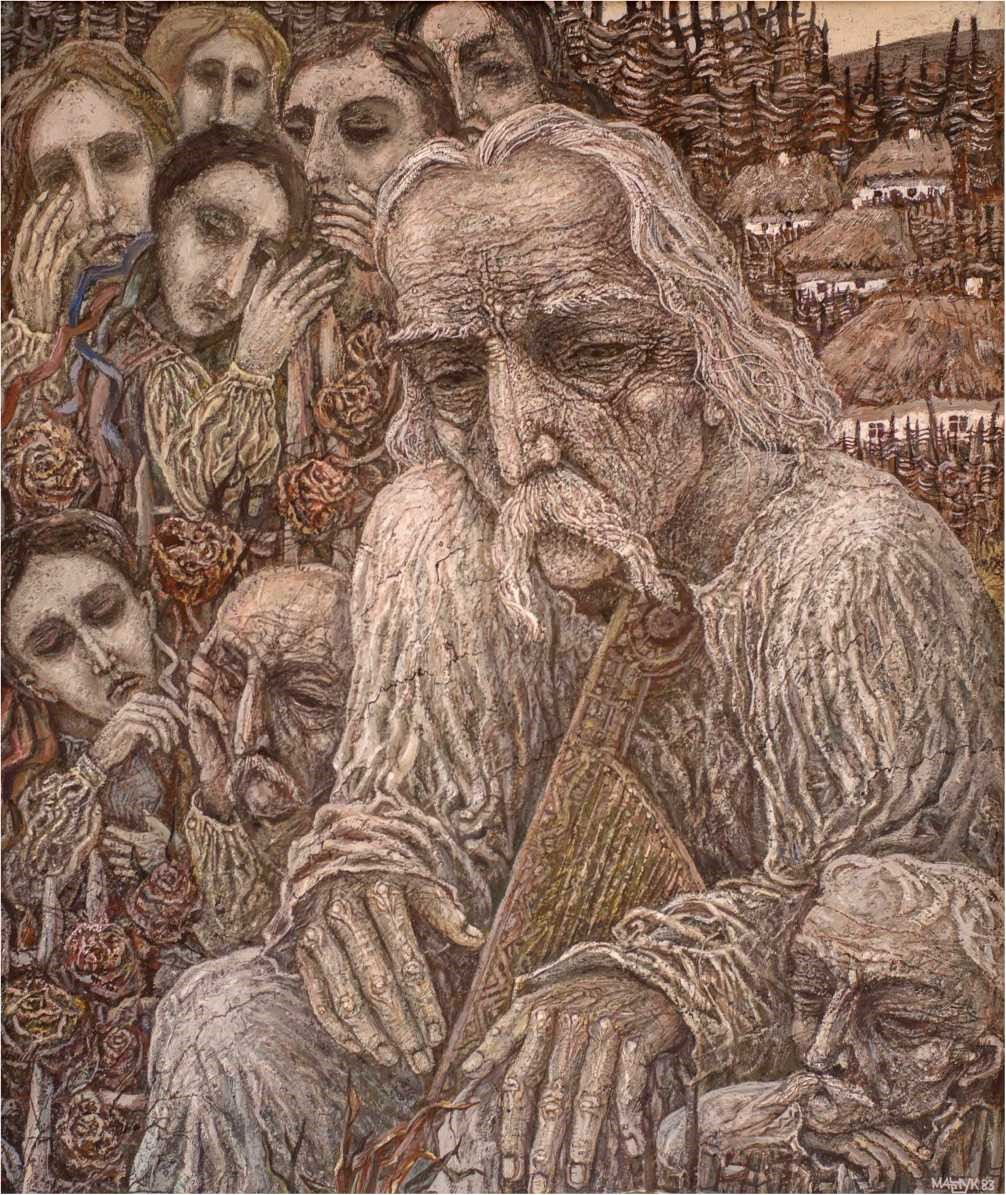
- Illustration by Ivan Marchuk to Taras Shevchenko's poem "Tarasova Nacht"
- Artist: Ivan Marchuk
- Year: 1983–1984
- Location: Shevchenko National Preserve, National Museum Taras Shevchenko

The Shevchenkiana by Ivan Marchuk is a series of works from the collection "Voice of my soul" by the Ukrainian painter Ivan Marchuk, who holds the title of People's Artist of Ukraine and is a laureate of the Shevchenko National Prize of Ukraine.

== History of creation ==
Marchuk painted the first portrait of Taras Shevchenko at the age of thirteen, when he was in the 7th grade of a rural school in Ternopil Oblast. In 1964, the painter won a student competition with an image of Shevchenko in oil on canvas. He chose the lines from Kobzar as the title of the work: "I am punished, I am tormented, but I do not repent."

Both came from a hinterland Ukrainian village; both reached the highest artistic heights without patronage, thanks only to their innate talent and titanic work; both, despite their fame and glory, were recluses all their lives

— Ukrainian art historian Stanislav Bushak,

Marchuk's "Shevchenkiana" consists of 42 paintings (out of a hundred planned), which were made in tempera (1983-1984). Marchuk wanted to fully appreciate the environment in which Shevchenko made his prophecies and created vivid images through poetry. Therefore, he worked in Ukrainian villages, and not a single painting was created in the city. The artist conveyed the intensity of Shevchenko's words, the richness of spiritual aspirations, personal and existential searches, and philosophical reflections of the Kobzar.

I worked on each painting for three or four days. I painted on such a high, as if the sky had opened up to me: ideas, hints, inspiration just kept pouring in - from there, beauty is seen with optical precision. I wasn't walking, I was flying, as if I had grown wings like an angel. I seemed to feel everything Shevchenko had experienced. I lived, thought, and dreamed with Taras. He became like a brother to me, I saw through him. At that time I felt the poet so much that I closed my eyes and saw the plots of future paintings

— Ukrainian artist Ivan Marchuk,

== Public and critical reception ==
Dmytro Pavlychko notes the originality of the interpretation of Kobzar in this way:

Marchuk showed us his own Shevchenko, not like the Shevchenko of Slastion or Kasiian, but that is what makes him interesting. Perhaps the artist also had a goal to show that Kobzar is no longer a book, but the flesh of our land. The cracks that run through the palms, clothes, banduras, and foreheads of Shevchenko's characters resemble cracks in black soil dried out by dry winds. We can feel the hot dryness of the land, but also its fertility, steadfastness and indestructibility... He makes us read Shevchenko with different eyes, to comprehend him in a new way and to strengthen his philosophical spirit in ourselves

— Ukrainian poet, translator, literary critic, publicist, Sixties activist, public and political figure, Hero of Ukraine Dmytro Pavlychko,

In 1994, the Dnipro Publishing House published Kobzar with illustrations from Ivan Marchuk's Shevchenkiana. In 2014, the catalog "Shevchenkiana by Ivan Marchuk" was published in Ternopil, that effort was initiated and funded by the rector(president) of Ternopil National Economic University Andrii Krysovatyi.

Marchuk's paintings were exhibited at the Shevchenko National Preserve (1983-1985, 1995, 1997), the National Museum Taras Shevchenko (1991, 1998), the House of the National Writers' Union of Ukraine (1984), the National Art Museum (2000), and others.

The paintings are kept in the Shevchenko National Preserve, while the portrait of the poet and an illustration to his message "To the Dead and the Living" are kept in the National Museum of Taras Shevchenko.

== List of paintings ==
Marchuk named individual paintings after specific stanzas from poems by Taras Shevchenko.

| No. | Painting | Title | Technique | Dimensions (cm) | Date | Notes |
|---|---|---|---|---|---|---|
| 1. | | Illustration to Taras Shevchenko's poem "Mariia" | Cardboard on tempera | 60 × 50 | 1983 | |
| 2. | | Illustration to Taras Shevchenko's poetry "The Wind is blowing down the street" | Cardboard on tempera | 60 × 50 | 1983 | |
| 3. | | Illustration to Taras Shevchenko's poem "Mariia" | Cardboard on tempera | 60 × 50 | 1983 | |
| 4. | | Illustration to Taras Shevchenko's poem "Mariia" | Cardboard on tempera | 60 × 50 | 1983 | |
| 5. | | Illustration to Taras Shevchenko's poem "Mariia" | Cardboard on tempera | 60 × 50 | 1983 | |
| 6. | | Illustration to Taras Shevchenko's poem "Dream" ("I reaped wheat on the landlord's land") | Cardboard on tempera | 60 × 50 | 1983 | |
| 7. | | Illustration to Taras Shevchenko's poetry "And golden and dear" | Cardboard on tempera | 60 × 50 | 1983 | |
| 8. | | Illustration to Taras Shevchenko's poem "Kateryna" | Cardboard on tempera | 60 × 50 | 1983 | |
| 9. | | Illustration to Taras Shevchenko's poetry "A cherry orchard near the house" | Cardboard on tempera | 60 × 50 | 1983 | |
| 10. | | Illustration to Taras Shevchenko's poetry "Sometimes in captivity I remember" | Cardboard on tempera | 60 × 50 | 1983 | |
| 11. | | Illustration to Taras Shevchenko's poetry "Behind the ravine is a ravine..." | Cardboard on tempera | 60 × 50 | 1983 | |
| 12. | | Illustration to Taras Shevchenko's poem "Neophytes" | Cardboard on tempera | 60 × 50 | 1983 | |
| 13. | | Illustration to Taras Shevchenko's poem "Neophytes" | Cardboard on tempera | 60 × 50 | 1983 | |
| 14. | | Illustration to Taras Shevchenko's poem "Haidamaky" | Cardboard on tempera | 60 × 50 | 1983 | |
| 15. | | Illustration to Taras Shevchenko's poem "Haidamaky" | Cardboard on tempera | 60 × 50 | 1983 | |
| 16. | | Illustration to Taras Shevchenko's poem "Haidamaky" | Cardboard on tempera | 60 × 50 | 1983 | |
| 17. | | Illustration to Taras Shevchenko's poetry "In Our Paradise on Earth" | Cardboard on tempera | 60 × 50 | 1983 | |
| 18. | | Illustration to the poem "Monk" by Taras Shevchenko | Cardboard on tempera | 60 × 50 | 1983 | |
| 19. | | Illustration to Taras Shevchenko's poem "Tytarivna" | Cardboard on tempera | 60 × 50 | 1983 | |
| 20. | | Illustration to Taras Shevchenko's poetry "To A. Kozachkovskyi" | Cardboard on tempera | 60 × 50 | 1983 | |
| 21. | | Illustration to Taras Shevchenko's poetry "Days pass, nights pass..." | Cardboard on tempera | 60 × 50 | 1983 | |
| 22. | | Portrait of Taras Shevchenko. Illustration to Taras Shevchenko's poetry "A day goes by and a night goes by" | Cardboard on tempera | 60 × 50 | 1983 | |
| 23. | | Illustration to Taras Shevchenko's poetry "Thought" ("Water flows into the blue sea...") | Cardboard on tempera | 60 × 50 | 1983 | |
| 24. | | Illustration to Taras Shevchenko's poem "The Slave" | Cardboard on tempera | 60 × 50 | 1983 | |
| 25. | | Illustration to Taras Shevchenko's poem "Tarasova Night" | Cardboard on tempera | 60 × 50 | 1983 | |
| 26. | | Illustration to Taras Shevchenko's poem "Ivan Pidkova" | Cardboard on tempera | 60 × 50 | 1983 | |
| 27. | | Portrait of Taras Shevchenko. Illustration to Taras Shevchenko's poetry "Imitation of the 11th Psalm" | Cardboard on tempera | 60 × 50 | 1983 | |
| 28. | | Portrait of Taras Shevchenko. Illustration to Taras Shevchenko's poetry "Won't they leave us, the poor" | Cardboard on tempera | 60 × 50 | 1983 | |
| 29. | | Illustration to Taras Shevchenko's poem "Neophytes" | Cardboard on tempera | 60 × 50 | 1983 | |
| 30. | | Illustration to Taras Shevchenko's ballad "Bewitched" | Cardboard on tempera | 60 × 50 | 1983 | |
| 31. | | Illustration to Taras Shevchenko's ballad "Bewitched" | Cardboard on tempera | 60 × 50 | 1983 | |
| 32. | | Illustration to the ballad "Poplar" by Taras Shevchenko | Cardboard on tempera | 60 × 50 | 1983 | |
| 33. | | Illustration to Taras Shevchenko's poetry "Both Archimedes and Galileo..." | Cardboard on tempera | 60 × 50 | 1983 | |
| 34. | | Illustration to Taras Shevchenko's poetry "Was, am I doing what, or am I walking" | Cardboard on tempera | 60 × 50 | 1983 | |
| 35. | | Illustration to Taras Shevchenko's poem "The Owl" | Cardboard on tempera | 60 × 50 | 1983—1984 | |
| 36. | | Illustration to Taras Shevchenko's poetry "At That Kateryna's" | Cardboard on tempera | 60 × 50 | 1983—1984 | |
| 37. | | Illustration to Taras Shevchenko's poem "Tytarivna" | Cardboard on tempera | 60 × 50 | 1983—1984 | |
| 38. | | Illustration to Taras Shevchenko's poem "Tytarivna" | Cardboard on tempera | 60 × 50 | 1983—1984 | |
| 39. | | Illustration to Taras Shevchenko's poem "Kateryna" | Cardboard on tempera | 60 × 50 | 1983—1984 | |
| 40. | | Illustration to Taras Shevchenko's poetry "Isaiah. Chapter 35" (Imitation. "Rejoice, O Field Unploughed") | Cardboard on tempera | 60 × 50 | 1983—1984 | |
| 41. | | Illustration to Taras Shevchenko's poetry "Oh Three Roads Wide" | Cardboard on tempera | 60 × 50 | 1983—1984 | |
| 42. | | Illustration to Taras Shevchenko's poetry "I grew up in a foreign land" | Cardboard on tempera | 60 × 50 | 1983—1984 | |

== Awards ==
In 1997, Ivan Marchuk was awarded the Shevchenko National Prize of Ukraine for his series of works "Shevchenkiana" from the collection "Voice of my soul".

== See also ==
- Pliontanism
