= Ivan Marchuk =

Ukrainian artist

- Іван Марчук
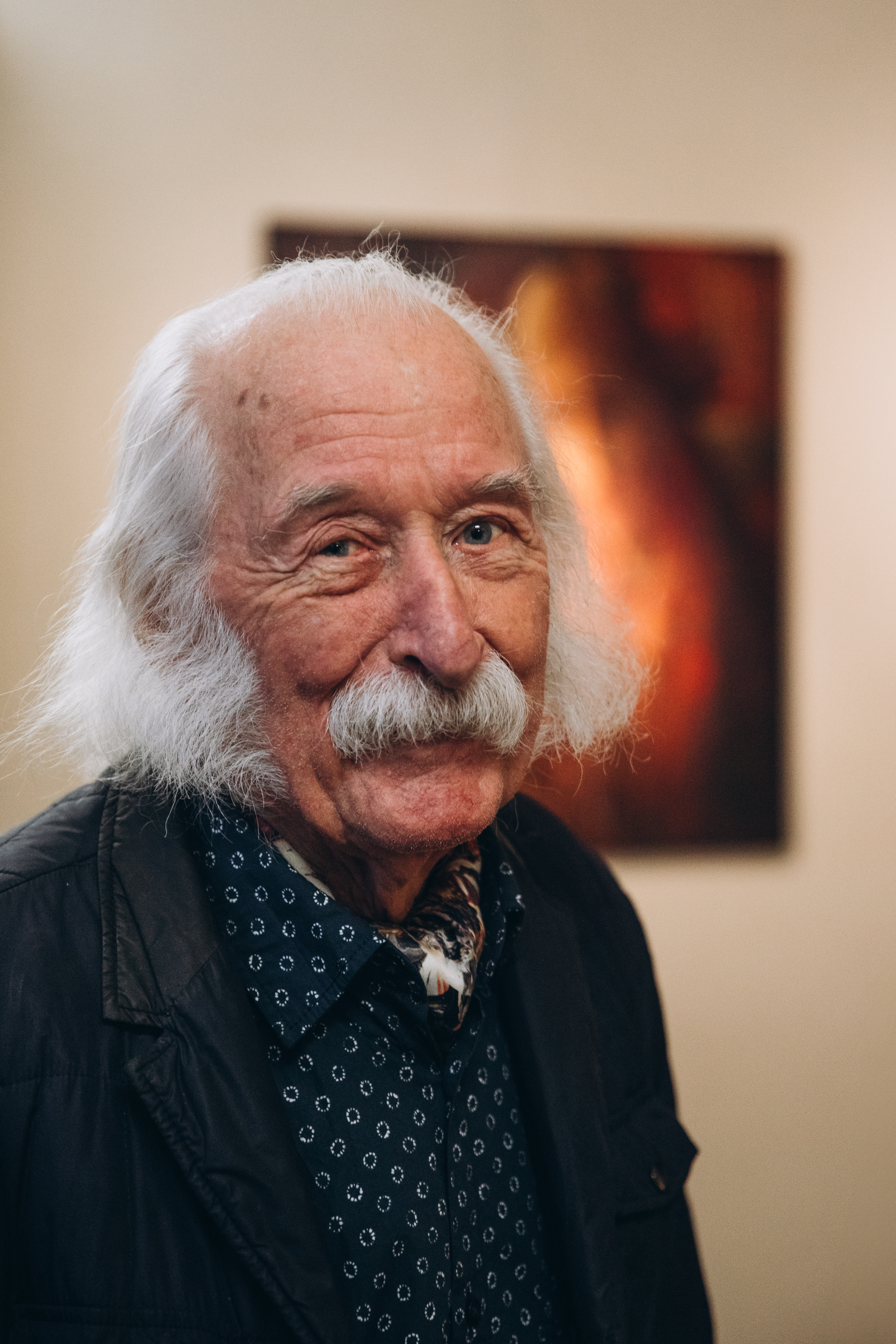
- Born: 12 May 1936 (age 90); Moskalówka, Tarnopol Voivodeship, Second Polish Republic (now Ukraine)
- Education: Lviv Ivan Trush School of Applied Arts; Lviv Institute of Applied Art
- Known for: Painting

Ivan Stepanovych Marchuk (Ukrainian: Іван Степанович Марчук; born 12 May 1936) is a contemporary Ukrainian painter, founder of the Pliontanism technique, Merited Artist of Ukraine, laureate of the Shevchenko National Prize, Honorary Academician of the National Academy of Arts of Ukraine, Honorary Citizen of Ternopil, Kyiv and Kaniv.

== Early life and education ==
Ivan Marchuk was born into a family of weavers. To help the family make ends meet, Marchuk often helped his father with work. He began to paint when he was a child. In spite of a lack of art materials — e.g., paint, pastel, watercolor, paper — Marchuk managed to make art with the natural pigment of flowers, blades of grass, and fruit. After graduating from a seven-year school, he entered the Ivan Trush Lviv School of Applied Arts in the department of decorative painting, where he studied from 1951 to 1956. While his parents had wanted him to study to become a surgeon or biologist, they dared not stand in the way of his obvious talent and dreams. He described this period of his education as transformative, paying homage to progressive teachers who inspired him to explore beyond the ideological safe space of socialist realism. He ended up joining an underground group in 1959 led by one of his teachers, Karlo Zvirynskyi, who introduced its members to unsanctioned art, history, music, literature, and religion. After serving in the Soviet Army, he continued his studies at the Department of Ceramics of the Lviv Institute of Applied Arts, graduating in 1965. To earn money, he also worked for an organization that made posters and placards for factories, clubs, and theaters. Later he worked in Kyiv. From 1965 to 1968 he worked at the Institute of Superhard Materials of the National Academy of Sciences of Ukraine. Low pay and residence in a communal apartment, however, made life in the capital difficult for him. To supplement his income, he made illustrations for magazines "Ukraine", "Kyiv", "Motherland", filled an order from the newspaper "Ranok" for a small drawing and cover design. In 1968, Marchuk sold his first work for 30 karbovanets to Yuriy Shcherbak. From 1968 to 1984 he was employed at the Kyiv Plant of Monumental and Decorative Arts. In his free time, Marchuk poured his soul into his own art, experimenting with different forms, such as inking and tempera, and looking for ways to get his art abroad.

== Professional work and persecution ==
It was at this point in his life that the KGB began to harass him for his non-conformist leanings, reaching the peak of their repressive activities in the 1970s. The Soviet authorities took particular issue with the darker colors used by Marchuk, which they considered ill-placed in the characteristically bright depictions of socialist realism. In addition to the charges of deviations from socialist realism, the KGB suspected Marchuk of Ukrainian nationalist sympathies; for he came from Lviv, spoke Ukrainian, and depicted Ukrainian figures. Because the Union of Artists of the USSR refused to let him into its ranks, he could not participate in exhibitions and sell his work. It was only in 1980 that Marchuk had his first exhibition in Kyiv, sponsored by the writers Pavlo Zahrebelnyi and Dmytro Pavlychko. In 1984, Marchuk was fired from the Kyiv Plant of Monumental and Decorative Arts. While he was able to sell some work in individual exhibitions held at the department of the arts in the National Library and other institutions, his lack of access to art galleries greatly restricted his opportunities. When Mikhail Gorbachev became General Secretary in 1985, the KGB ceased harassing Marchuk; thereafter, his hopes to emigrate rose. In 1988, he got the chance to visit Czechoslovakia, where he made an impression on the art community there. In 1989, through the efforts of his Ukrainian-Australian artist friend Peter Kravchenko, he was allowed a visa to visit Australia, where his works were exhibited by the Ukrainian Artists Society of Australia as well as by commercial galleries in Sydney. He later travelled to Canada. While abroad, the Artists Union of the USSR finally granted him membership, though apparently without notifying him. In 1990, his first official exhibition in his home country took place in Kyiv at the State Art Museum of Ukrainian Fine Arts (now the National Art Museum of Ukraine). Not having been valued in the Soviet Union, Marchuk was well accepted in the newly-independent Ukraine, obtaining the prestigious Shevchenko National Prize in 1997.

== Recent activity ==
No matter the distance travelled abroad, he never lost his love of the Ukrainian land, which he continued to depict in his extremely detailed landscape drawings. In 2001, he decided to move back to Ukraine. He finally returned in 2011. Since an announcement by then-president Viktor Yushchenko in 2005, there have been tentative plans to build a museum for Ivan Marchuk and his work in Kyiv. Before the large-scale Russian invasion, he lived and worked in Kyiv.

=== Vienna period ===
After the beginning of the large-scale Russian invasion, he was forced to emigrate to Vienna, where he created about 200 works between 2022 and 2025, and large exhibitions of the artist's works were organized in the Austrian capital. On 2 May 2025, the exhibition "Tell Me the Truth" opened in Vienna, featuring more than 450 paintings by the artist. An international children's drawing competition "The Paths of Ivan Marchuk" was also launched. Before the vernissage, Ivan Marchuk's five-volume album-catalog "Voice of My Soul" was presented, which had been in the works for four years.

In early 2025, the Ivan Marchuk Charitable Foundation was founded to preserve, research, and popularize the artist's works, as well as to create a museum. In May 2025, the famous poet Lina Kostenko called for the creation of a museum of Ivan Marchuk in Kyiv. She also suggested that the cultural institution be located in the Murashko estate.

On 10 February 2025, under the auspices of the Embassy of Ukraine to the Holy See, Ivan Marchuk's solo exhibition "Epic Reality" was opened at the Palazzo della Cancelleria in Rome. On 12 February 2025, the artist had a private audience with Pope Francis.

== Style and legacy ==
Ivan Marchuk has produced over 5,000 works in his lifetime, half of which are located outside of Ukraine. He has displayed his work in numerous countries, including Latvia, Germany, Poland, Belgium, Hungary, Czech Republic, Slovakia, Turkey, Luxembourg, Thailand, Tunis, and others. He is well-known as the creator of the art technique “pliontanism”, which is characterized by high levels of detailed strokes that appear to weave into one another. Though some have likened his style to hyperrealism, Marchuk himself disagrees with this label.

=== On money and stamps ===
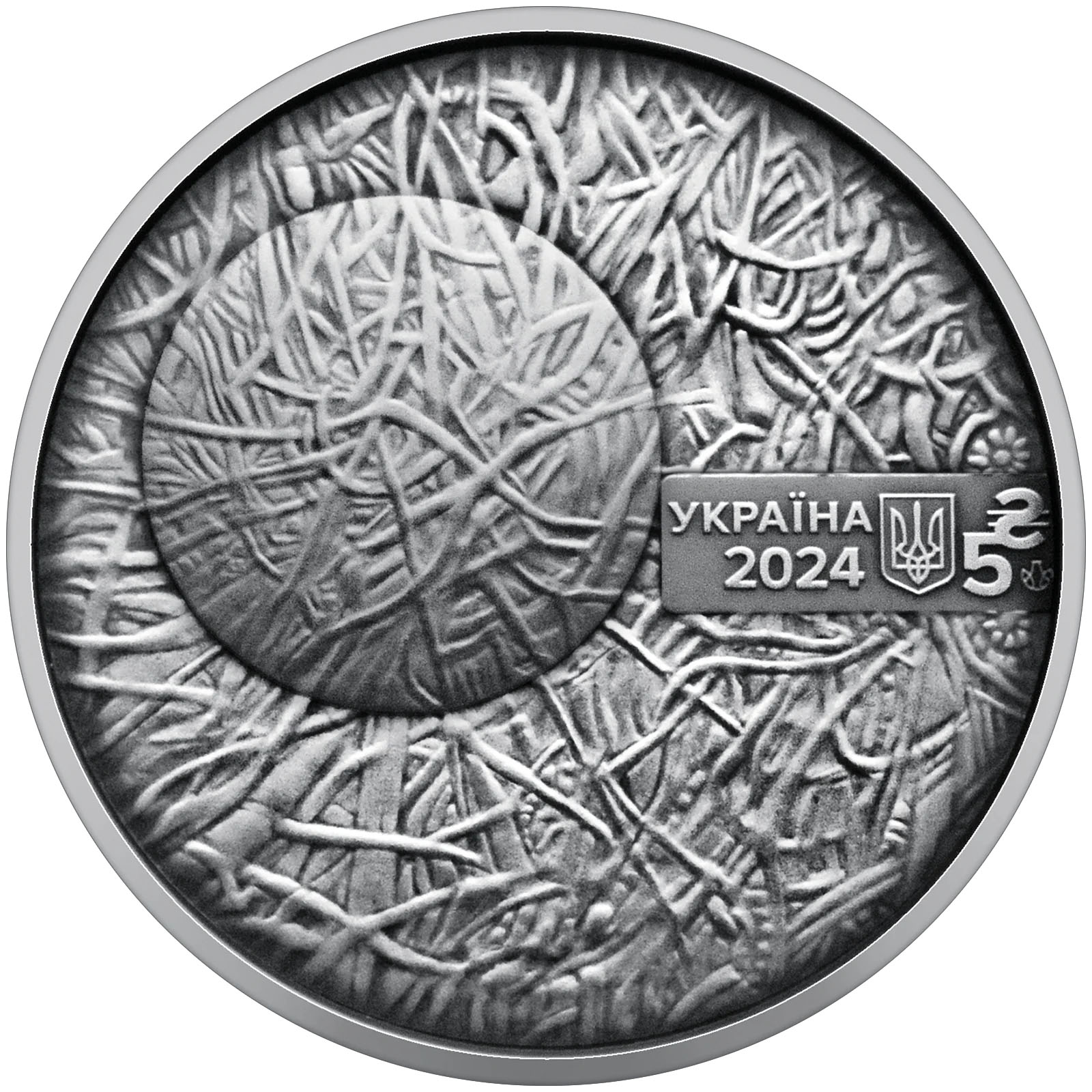
Obverse of the commemorative coin of denomination 5 hryvnia "Pliontanism (Ivan Marchuk)" National Bank of Ukraine (2024)

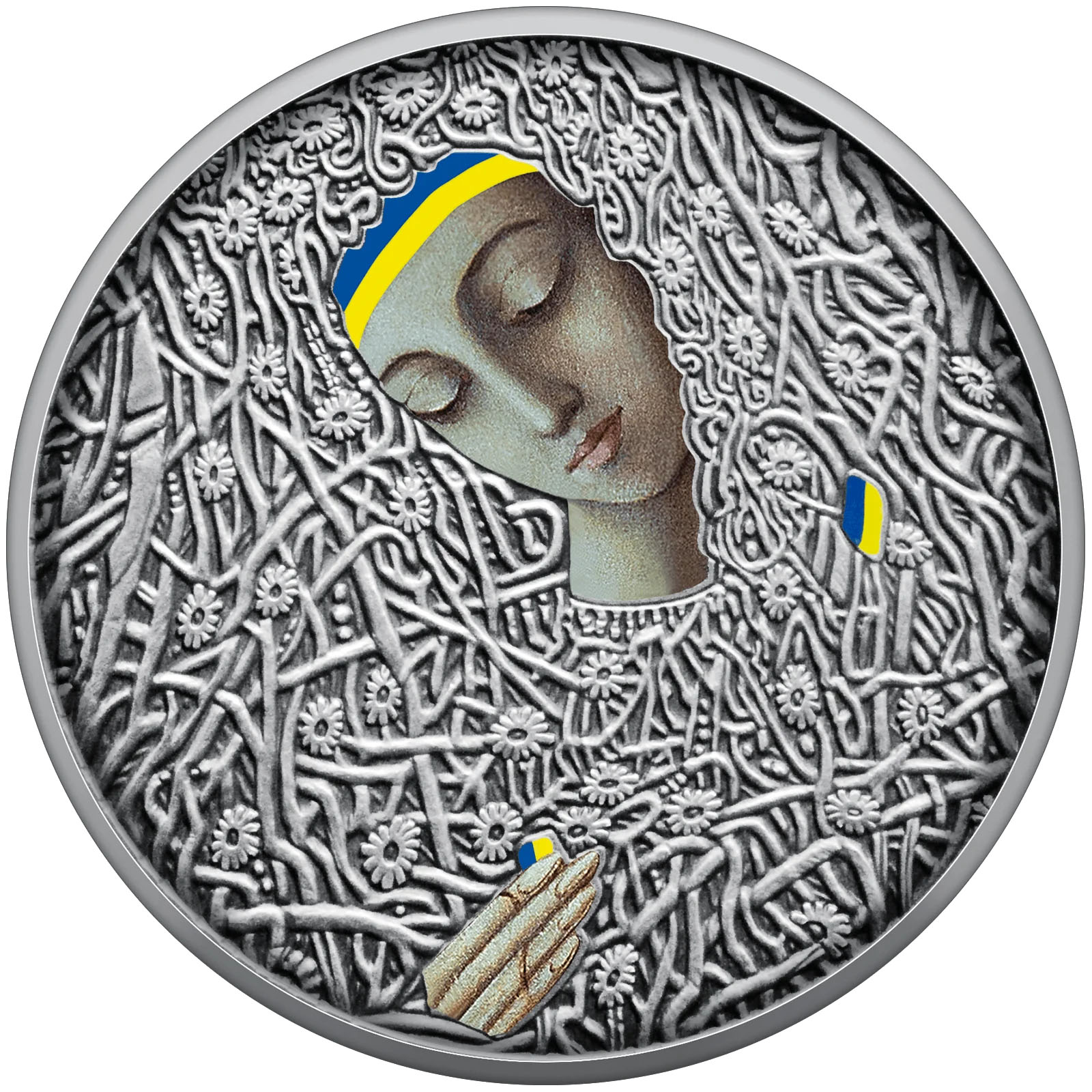
Reverse of the commemorative coin of denomination 5 hryvnia "Pliontanism (Ivan Marchuk)" National Bank of Ukraine (2024)

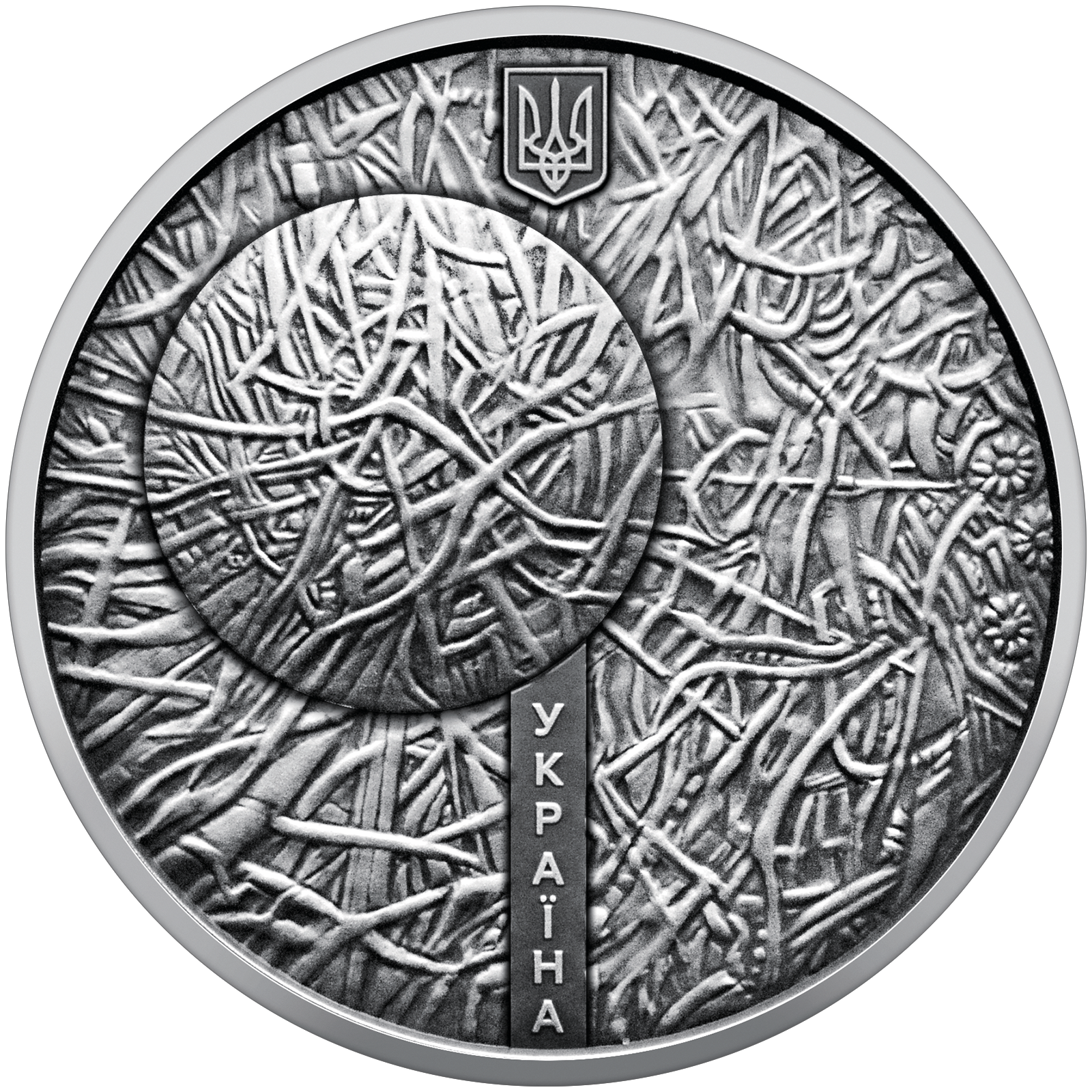
Obverse of the commemorative silver coin of denomination 10 hryvnia "Pliontanism (Ivan Marchuk)" National Bank of Ukraine (2024)

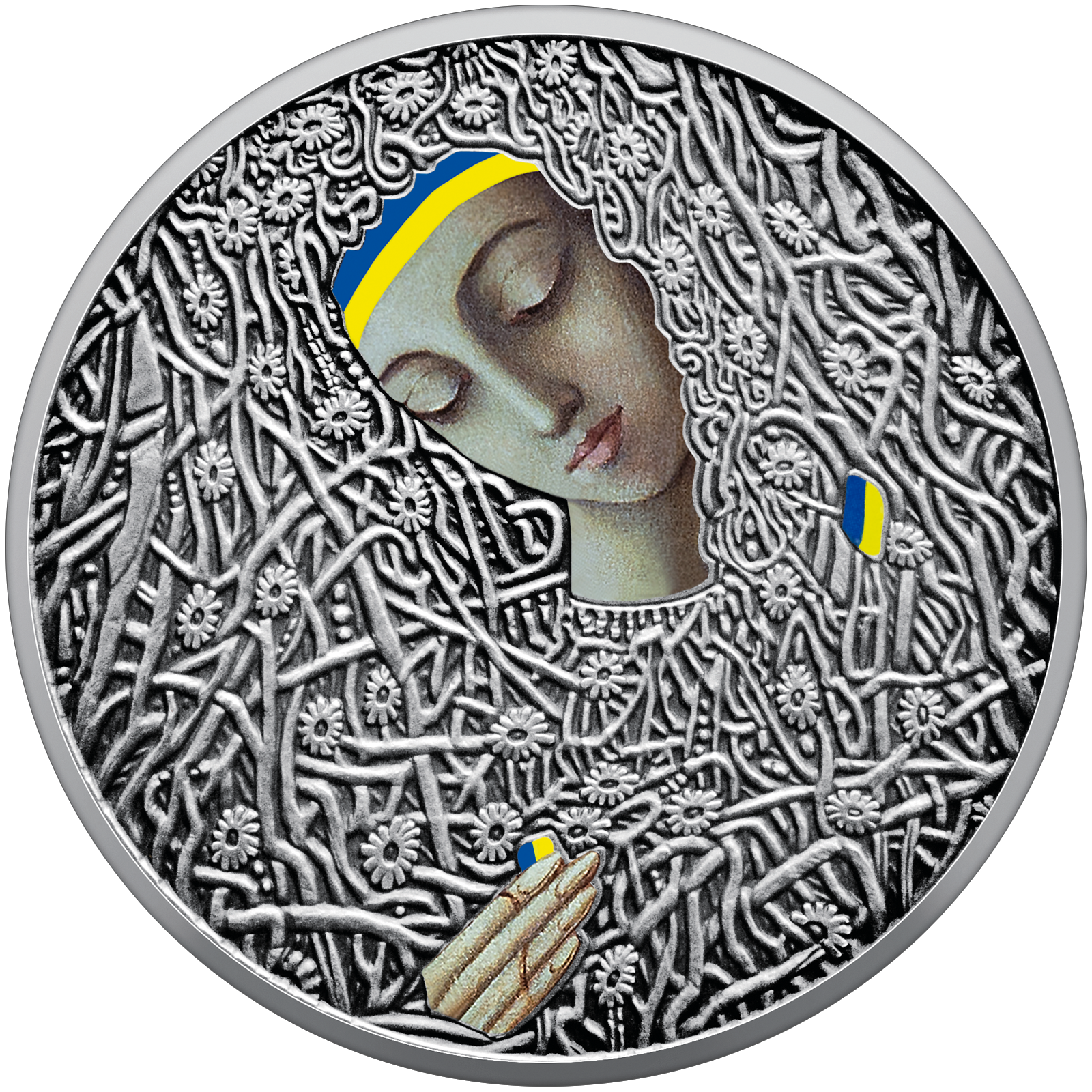
Reverse of the commemorative silver coin of denomination 10 hryvnia "Pliontanism (Ivan Marchuk)" National Bank of Ukraine (2024)

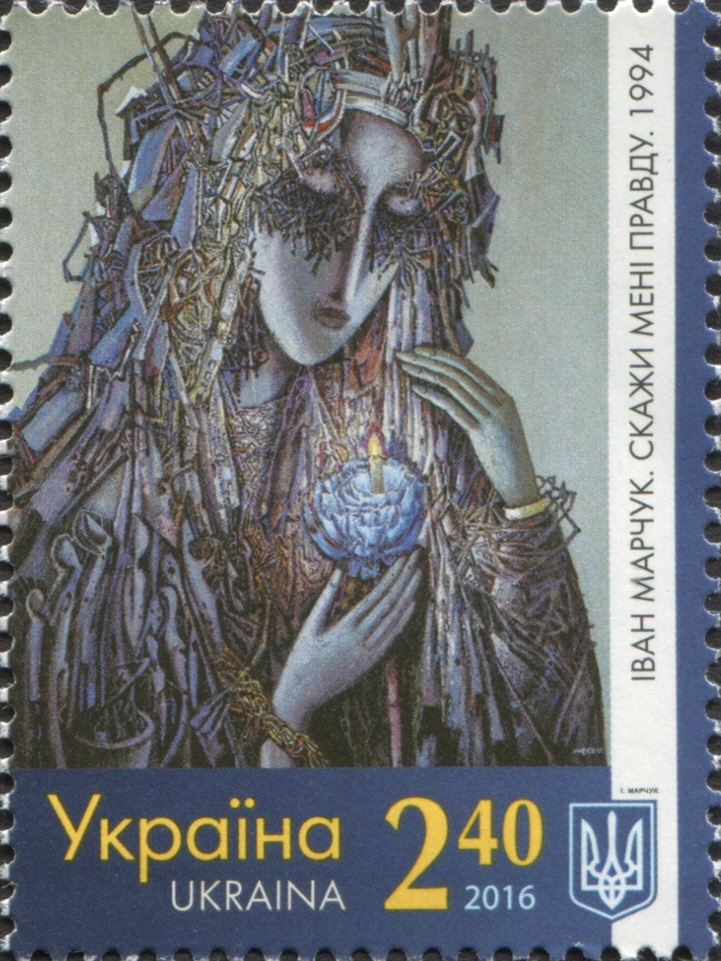
Stamp of Ukraine "Ivan Marchuk ‘Tell Me the Truth’. 1994" (2016)

== Books ==
Atlant UMC has published 3 books on the artist's oeuvre. A large monograph titled "Ivan Marchuk" (2004) illustrates all stages of his creative career. The second album deals with the period 1965-2005. The third album was published in the series "Painting" (2008).

For 2013-2016, Fenix published three books by Ivan Marchuk.

In February 2017, Felix published a catalogue of Marchuk’s early work, titled “Ivan Marchuk’s Painting Parables: The Early Period.” German art expert Olena Balun and Ukrainian researcher Tamara Strypko wrote the foreword.

In February 2018, Folkart Gallery published the book “Echo of Dreams” in Ukrainian, English, and Turkish, containing 300 of the artist’s canvases.

== Ivan Marchuk Prize ==
On 31 May 2016, the third session of the Ternopil Oblast Council supported the project to launch the annual Ivan Marchuk Regional Award for Gifted Children aged 7 to 15 in the field of fine arts in 2016.

== Family ==
Marchuk was romantically linked to art critic Alla Pivnenko in the 1970s, who taught at the Kharkiv Art and Industrial Institute. The two had one daughter, violinist Bohdana Pivnenko.

== Distinctions and awards ==
- 1996 — received the title of Honored Artist of Ukraine
- 7 March 1997 — became a laureate of the Shevchenko National Prize of Ukraine, for series of paintings "Shevchenkiana", "Voice of my soul"
- 2006 — The International Academy of Contemporary Art in Rome accepted Ivan Marchuk into the ranks of the Golden Guild and elected him an honorary member of the scientific council of the academy
- 2026 — Austrian Decoration for Science and Art

== Literature ==
- "Virtual Dreams of Ivan Marchuk". Welcome to Ukraine, 4, 1999.
- Ivan Marchuk: Album-catalogue. — Kyiv: CJSC Atlant UMS, 2004. — 519 p. — ISBN 966-95919-7-X. (in Ukrainian and English)
- Ivan Marchuk. Creative period 1965–2005: [Album]. — [Kyiv: CJSC Atlant UMS, 2005]. — 28 p. (in Ukrainian and English)
- Іван Марчук. Дорога додому: Альбом. — К.: ТОВ «Атлант ЮЕмСі», 2008. — [135] с. — ISBN 978-966-8968-22-8. (in Ukrainian and English)
