= Yarmolyntsi =

Rural locality in Khmelnytskyi Oblast, Ukraine

Yarmolyntsi Ярмолинці
- Rural settlement
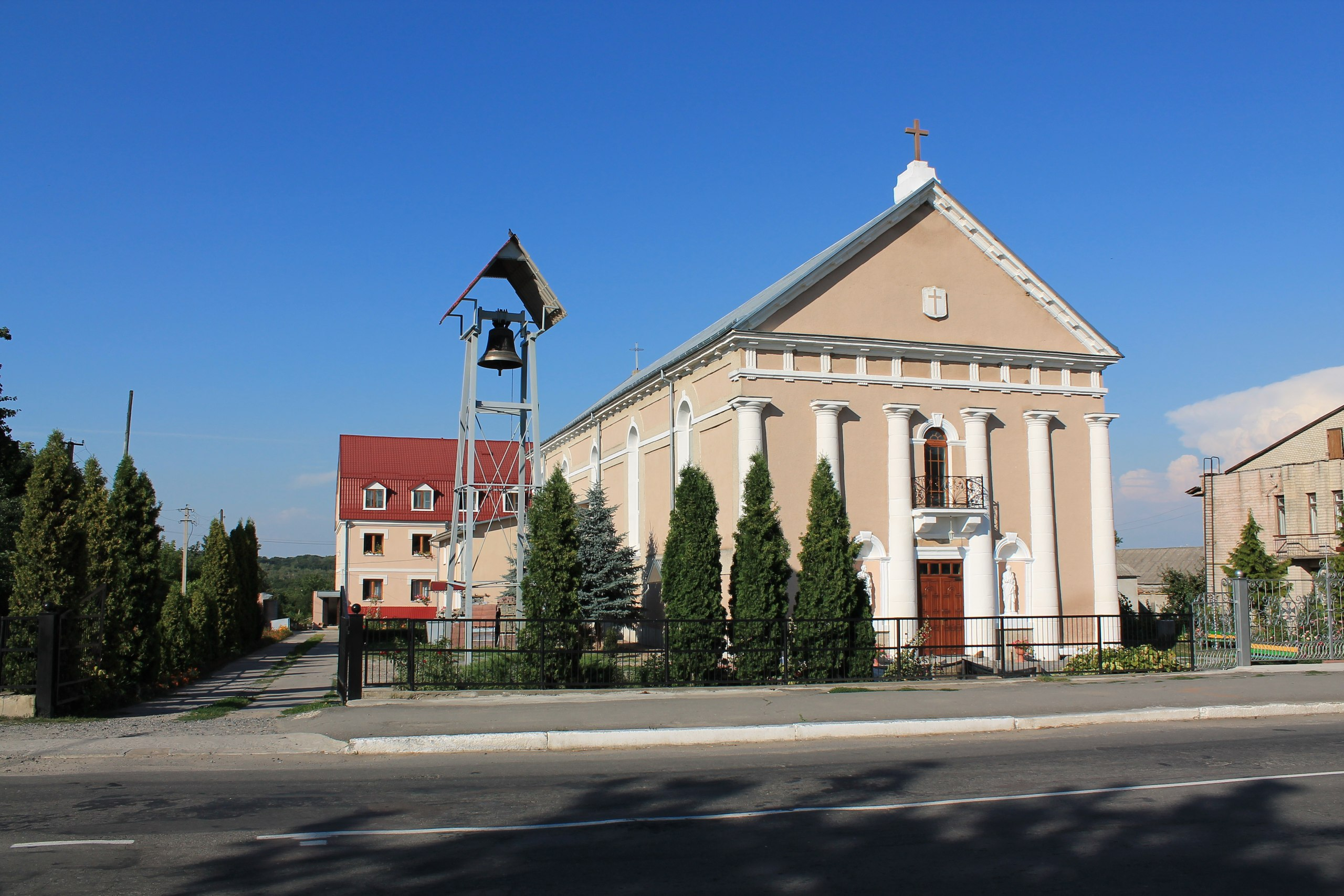
- Saints Peter and Paul church

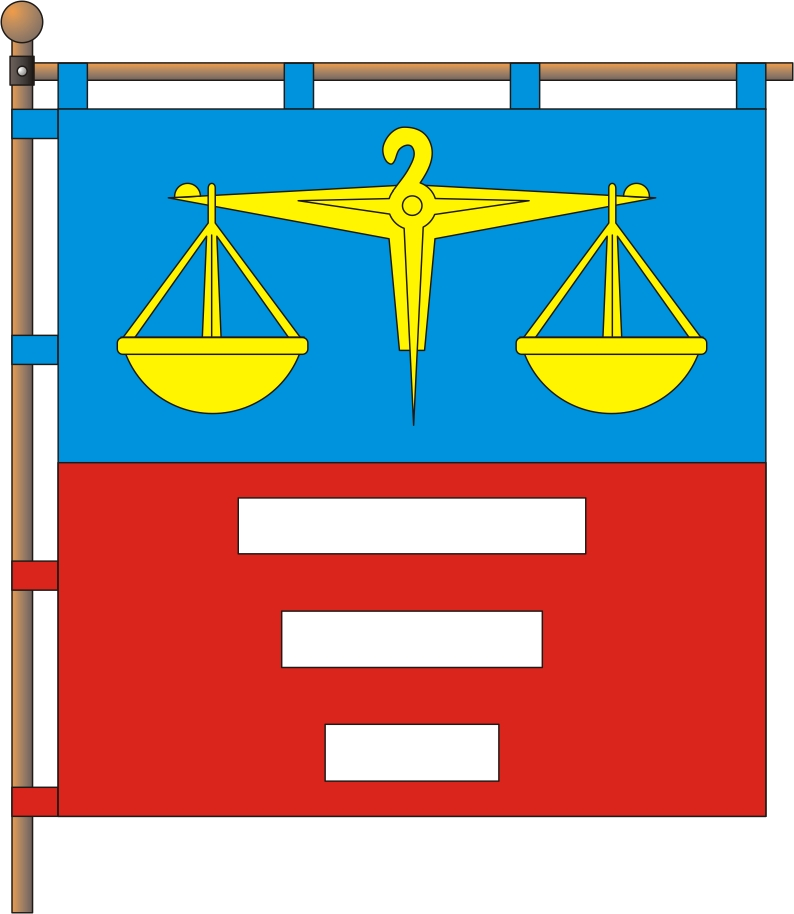
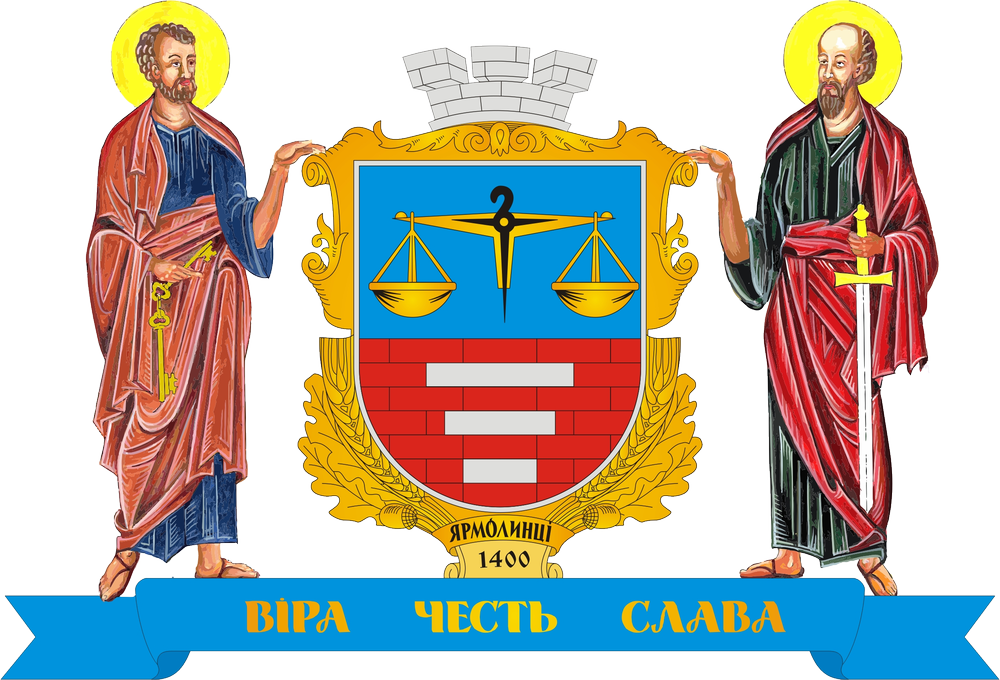
- Flag Coat of arms

- Location of Yarmolyntsi in Khmelnytskyi Oblast Yarmolyntsi (Ukraine)
- Coordinates: 49°11′33″N 26°50′23″E
- Country: Ukraine
- Oblast: Khmelnytskyi Oblast
- Raion: Khmelnytskyi Raion
- Hromada: Yarmolyntsi settlement hromada
- Founded: 1400
- Town status: 1958

Government
  - Town Head: Viktor Khoptyar

Area
  - Total: 4.46 km^{2} (1.72 sq mi)
- Elevation: 341 m (1,119 ft)

Population (2022)
  - Total: 7,122 ▼
  - Density: 1,600/km^{2} (4,140/sq mi)
- Time zone: UTC+2 (EET)
  - Summer (DST): UTC+3 (EEST)
- Postal code: 32100
- Area code: +380 3853
- Website: http://rada.gov.ua/

Yarmolyntsi (Ukrainian: Ярмолинці; Polish: Jarmolińce; German: Jarmolynzi) is a rural settlement in Khmelnytskyi Raion, Khmelnytskyi Oblast, western Ukraine. It hosts the administration of Yarmolyntsi settlement hromada, one of the hromadas of Ukraine. The settlement's population was 8,806 as of the 2001 Ukrainian Census. Current population: 7,122 (2022 estimate).

== History ==
The settlement was first founded in 1400. It received the Magdeburg rights in 1455. Yarmolyntsi has had the status of an urban-type settlement since 1958.

Yarmolyntsi was occupied by the Nazis on 8 July 1941 during World War II. The next day, 16 Jewish men were shot to death on the outskirts of the town. Jews were required to wear Stars of David on their chests and backs and were often abused, some being hanged from trees. Eventually, they were forced into a ghetto. In late October 1942, Jews from Yarmolyntsi and surrounding towns were taken to the former military barracks. Several days later, they were forced to dig their own graves before being systematically shot to death. During the massacre, a group of Jews put up armed resistance and killed a number of Germans and Ukrainian auxiliary policemen. Yarmolyntsi was liberated by the Red Army on 27 March 1944.

Until 18 July 2020, Yarmolyntsi was the administrative center of Yarmolyntsi Raion. The raion was abolished in July 2020 as part of the administrative reform of Ukraine, which reduced the number of raions of Khmelnytskyi Oblast to three. The area of Yarmolyntsi Raion was merged into Khmelnytskyi Raion. On 26 January 2024, a new law entered into force which abolished the status of urban-type settlement, and Yarmolyntsi became a rural settlement.
