= Moskalivka, Ternopil Oblast =

Moskalivka Москалівка
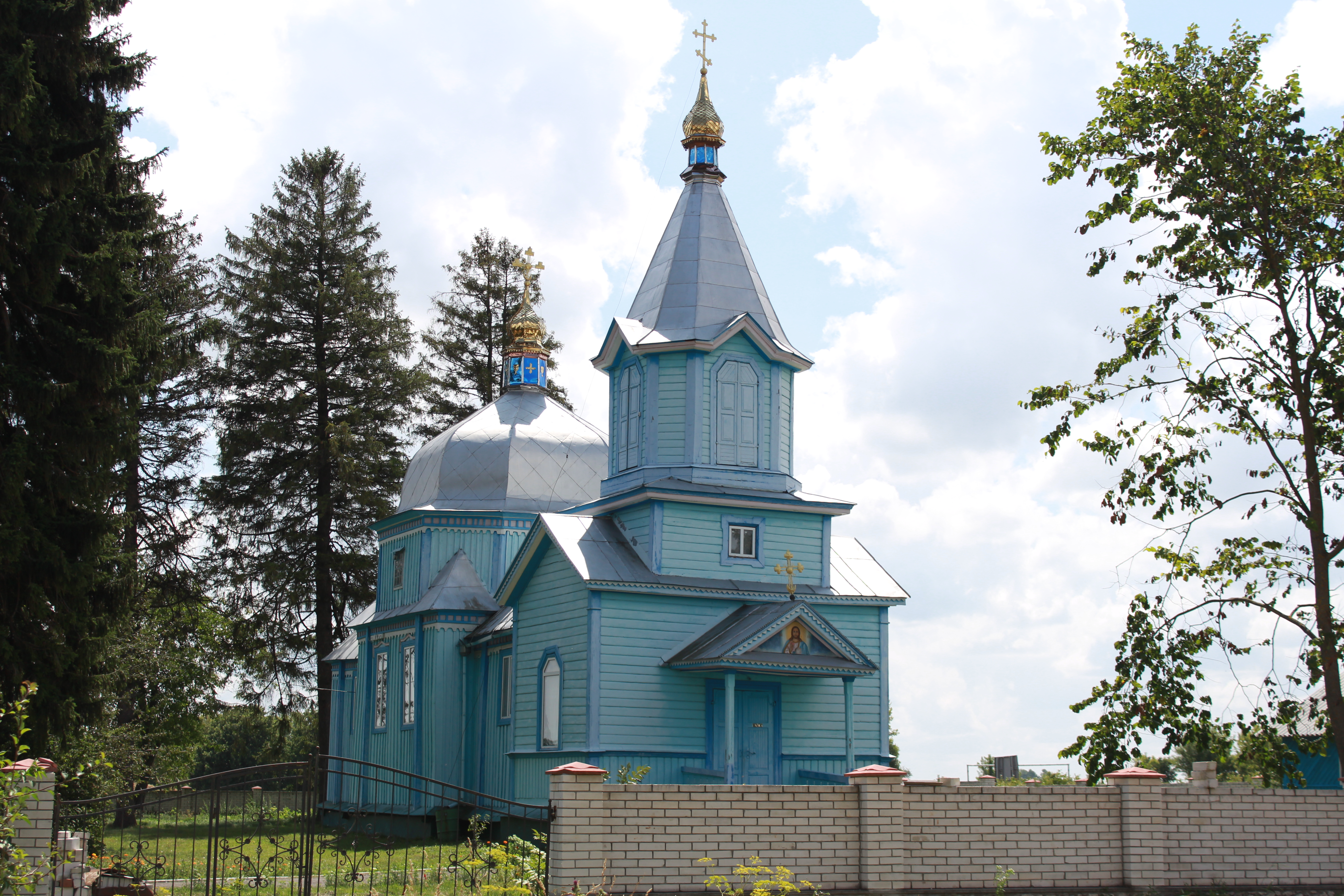
- Wooden church of Saint Demetrius of Thessalonica in Moskalivka

- Location in Ternopil Oblast Moskalivka (Ternopil Oblast)
- Coordinates: 49°45′16″N 26°7′35″E
- Country: Ukraine
- Oblast: Ternopil Oblast
- Raion: Kremenets Raion

Population (2003)
  - Total: 597
- Time zone: UTC+2 (EET)
  - Summer (DST): UTC+3 (EEST)
- Postal code: 47454

Moskalivka (Ukrainian: Москалівка) is a village in Ukraine, Ternopil Oblast, Kremenets Raion, Lanivtsi urban hromada. Until 2020, it was the center of the Moskalivka village council, which also had the village of Plyska under its jurisdiction. Near Moskalivka there were the hamlets of Vidvid, Virlia, Zakhrystia, and Zelena Krynytsia, now uninhabited.

== History ==
The first written mention was made on September 8, 1582, in the document Historical and Statistical Descriptions of the Volyn Eparchy as the estate of Knyaz Voivode Trotskyi.

On July 17, 2020, as a result of the administrative-territorial reform and liquidation of the Lanivtsi Raion, the village became part of the Kremenets Raion.

== Religion ==
- Church of Saint Demetrius of Thessalonica (1791, wooden with a bell tower),
- Chapel (19th century, rebuilt in 2002).

== Famous people ==
- Ivan Marchuk (b. 1936) is a Ukrainian painter, People's Artist of Ukraine (2002), laureate of the Taras Shevchenko National Prize of Ukraine (1997).

== Sources ==
- (in Ukrainian) С. Бойчук, Б. Мельничук, Москалівка // Ternopil Encyclopedic Dictionary: in 4 v. / editorial board: H. Yavorskyi and other, Ternopil: "Zbruch", 2005, V. 2: К—О, S. 566. — ISBN 966-528-199-2.
- (in Ukrainian) С. Бойчук, Б. Мельничук, Б. Петраш, Москалівка // Ternopil Oblast. History of cities and villages: in 3 v. / Ternopil: "Terno-graph", 2014, V. 2: Г—Л, S. 655–666. — ISBN 978-966-457-228-3.
- "Moskalówka (4)". Geographical Dictionary of the Kingdom of Poland (in Polish). 6. Warszawa: Kasa im. Józefa Mianowskiego. 1885. p. 704.
