= Yarmolyntsi Raion =

Former subdivision of Khmelnytskyi Oblast, Ukraine

Yarmolyntsi Raion Ярмолинецький район
- Raion
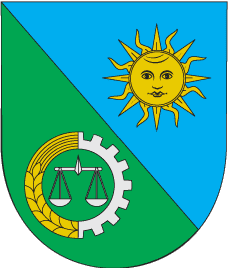
- Flag Coat of arms

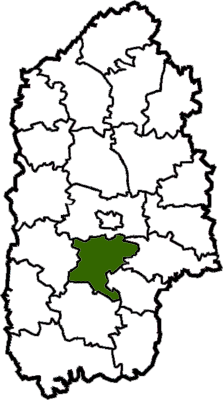
- Coordinates: 49°11′33″N 26°50′23″E
- Country: Ukraine
- Region: Khmelnytskyi Oblast
- Established: 7 March 1923
- Disestablished: 18 July 2020
- Admin. center: Yarmolyntsi
- Subdivisions: List: 0 — city councils; 1 — settlement councils; 29 — rural councils; Number of localities: 0 — cities; 1 — urban-type settlements; 59 — villages; 0 — rural settlements

Government
  - Governor: Valeriy Kadysh

Area
  - Total: 898 km^{2} (347 sq mi)

Population (2020)
  - Total: 27,866
  - Density: 31.0/km^{2} (80.4/sq mi)
- Time zone: UTC+02:00 (EET)
  - Summer (DST): UTC+03:00 (EEST)
- Postal index: 32100—32165
- Area code: +380 3843
- Website: http://yarmrda.com.ua

Yarmolyntsi Raion (Ukrainian: Ярмолинецький район, Yarmolynets'kyi raion) was one of the 20 administrative raions (a district) of Khmelnytskyi Oblast in western Ukraine. Its administrative center was located in the urban-type settlement of Yarmolyntsi. Its population was 39,201 as of the 2001 Ukrainian Census. The raion was abolished on 18 July 2020 as part of the administrative reform of Ukraine, which reduced the number of raions of Khmelnytskyi Oblast to three. The area of Yarmolyntsi Raion was merged into Khmelnytskyi Raion. The last estimate of the raion population was 27,866 (2020 est.)

== Geography ==
Yarmolyntsi Raion was located in the central part of Khmelnytskyi Oblast, corresponding to the modern-day boundaries of the Podolia historical region. Its total area constituted 898 square kilometres (347 mi^{2}) and about 4.5 percent of the oblast's area.

== History ==
Yarmolyntsi Raion was first established on March 7, 1923 as part of a full-scale administrative reorganization of the Ukrainian Soviet Socialist Republic.

== Subdivisions ==
At the time of disestablishment, the raion consisted of two hromadas:

- Solobkivtsi rural hromada with the administration in selo of Solobkivtsi;
- Yarmolyntsi settlement hromada with the administration in Yarmolyntsi.

Yarmolyntsi Raion was divided in a way that followed the general administrative scheme in Ukraine. Local government was also organized along a similar scheme nationwide. Consequently, raions were subdivided into councils, which were the prime level of administrative division in the country.

Each of the raion's urban localities administered their own councils, often containing a few other villages within its jurisdiction. However, only a handful of rural localities were organized into councils, which also might contain a few villages within its jurisdiction.

Accordingly, the Yarmolyntsi Raion was divided into:

- 1 settlement council—made up of the urban-type settlement of Yarmolyntsi (administrative center)
- 29 village councils

Overall, the raion had a total of 60 populated localities, consisting of one urban-type settlement, and 59 villages.
